= Islamic architecture =

Architectural styles of buildings associated with Islam

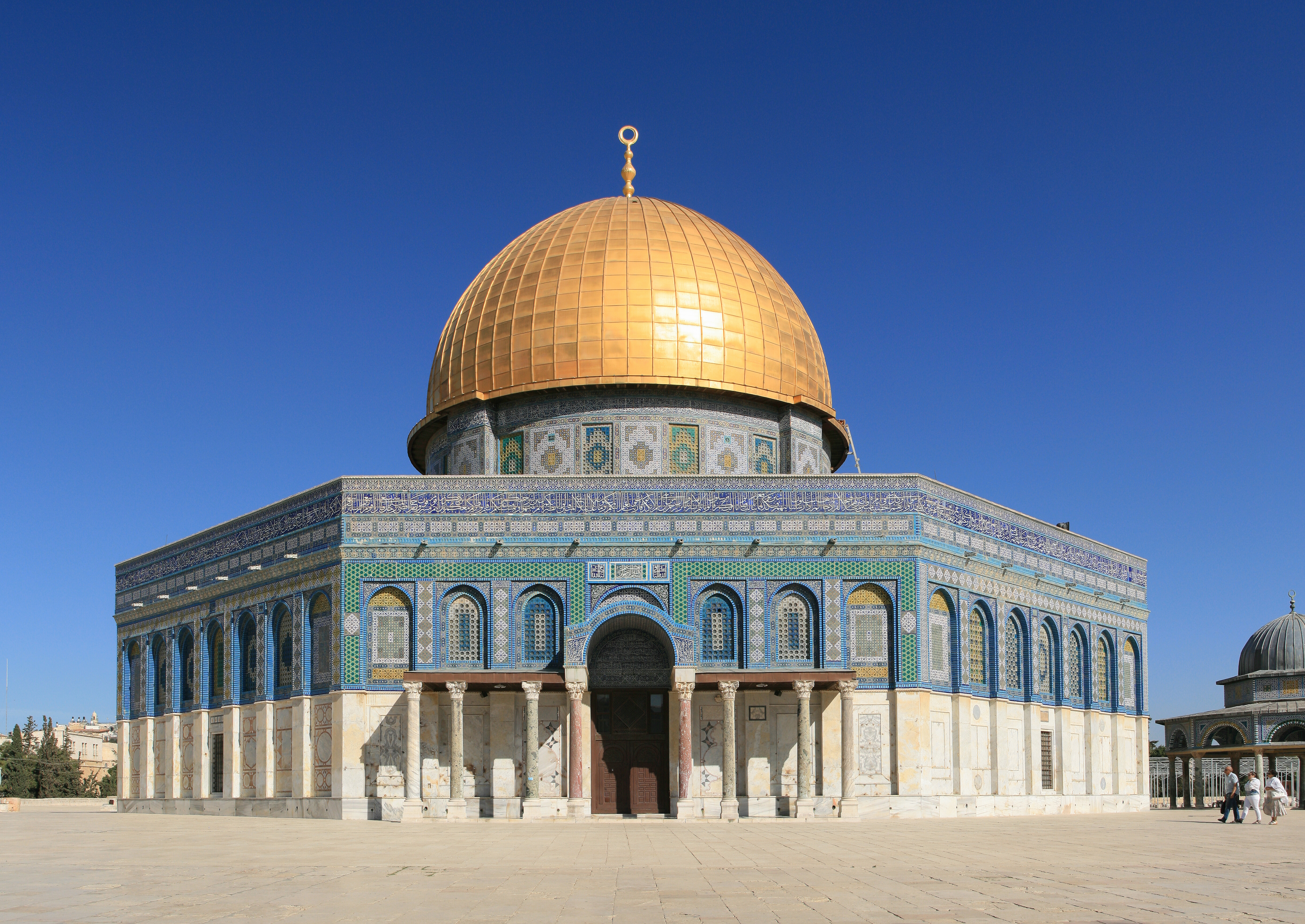
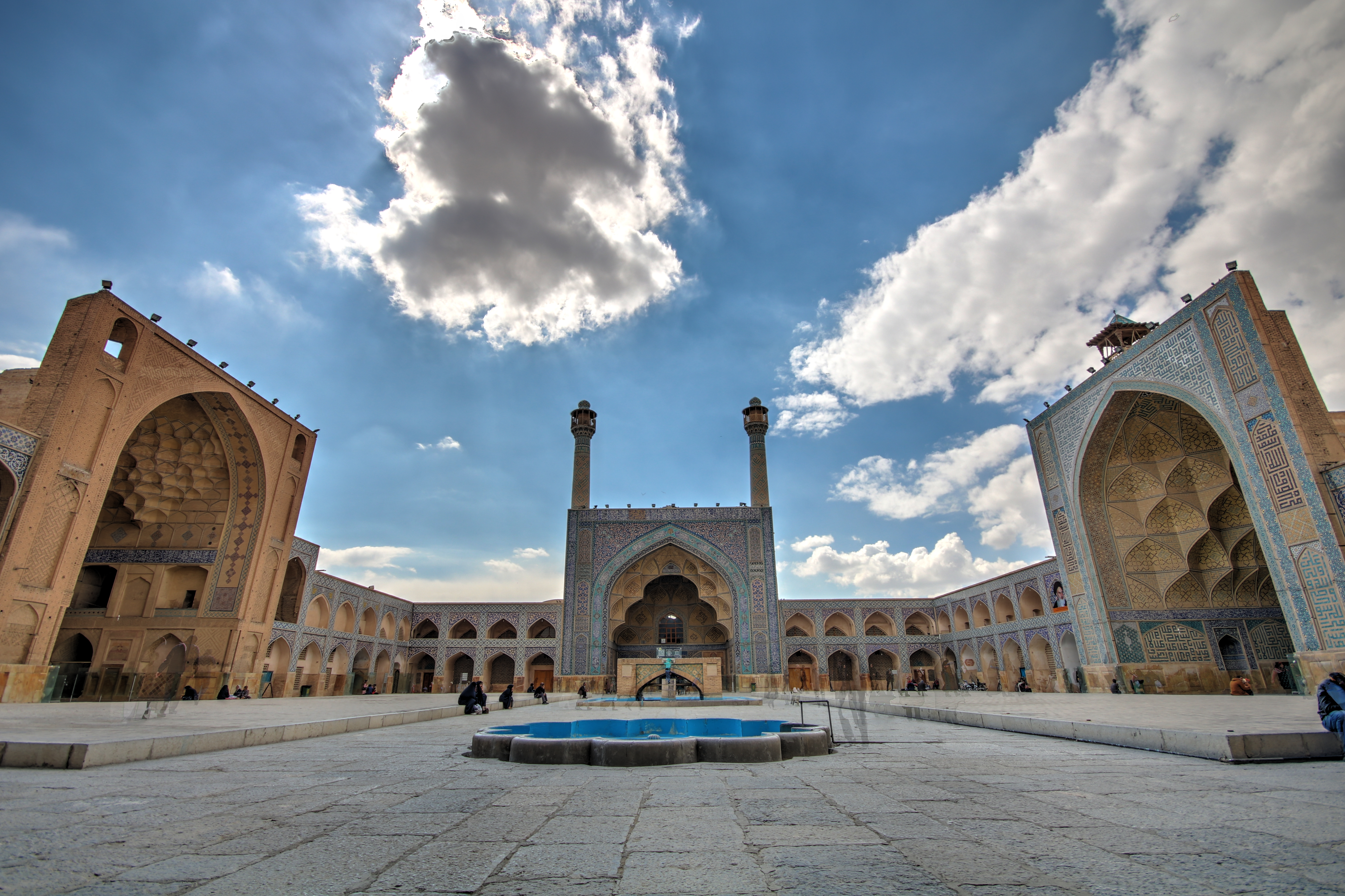
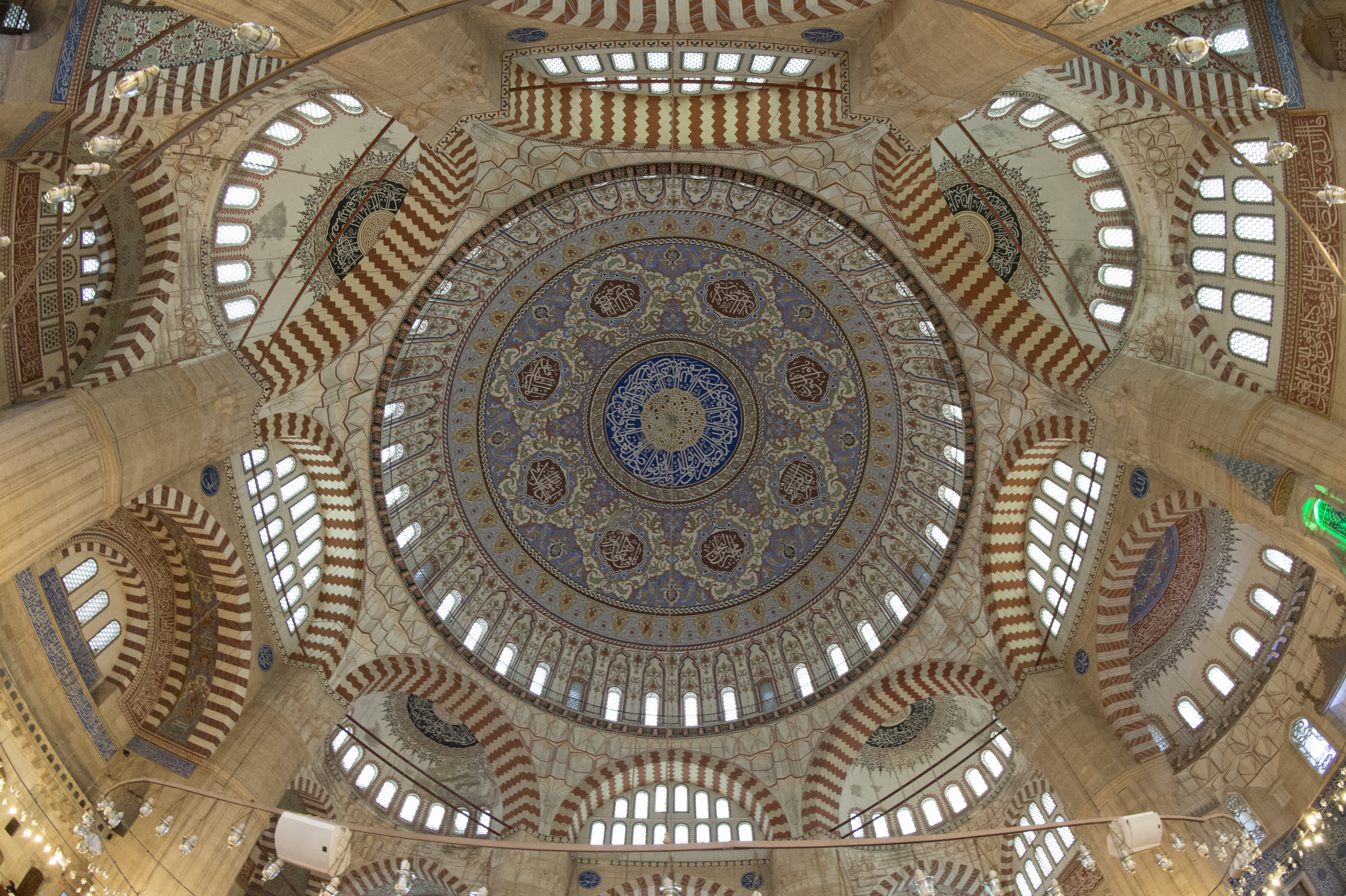
- Top: Dome of the Rock in Jerusalem; Middle: Jameh Mosque in Isfahan, Iran; Bottom: Dome of the Selimiye Mosque in Edirne, Turkey
- Location: Middle East, North Africa, Indian subcontinent, Southeast Asia, West Africa, East Africa, Central Asia

Islamic architecture comprises the architectural styles of buildings associated with Islamic civilization. It encompasses both secular and religious styles from the early history of Islam to the present day. The Islamic world encompasses a wide geographic area historically ranging from Western Africa and Europe to Eastern Asia. Certain commonalities are shared by Islamic architectural styles across all these regions, but over time different regions developed their own styles according to local materials and techniques, local dynasties and patrons, different regional centers of artistic production, and sometimes different religious affiliations.

Early Islamic architecture was influenced by Roman, Byzantine, Iranian, and Mesopotamian architecture and all other lands which the early Muslim conquests conquered in the seventh and eighth centuries. Later it developed distinct characteristics in the form of buildings and in the decoration of surfaces with Islamic calligraphy, arabesques, and geometric motifs. New architectural elements like minarets, muqarnas, and multifoil arches were invented. Common or important types of buildings in Islamic architecture include mosques, madrasas, tombs, palaces, hammams (public baths), Sufi hospices (e.g. khanqahs or zawiyas), fountains and sabils, commercial buildings (e.g. caravanserais and bazaars), and military fortifications.

== Early history (up to 10th century) ==
=== Origins ===
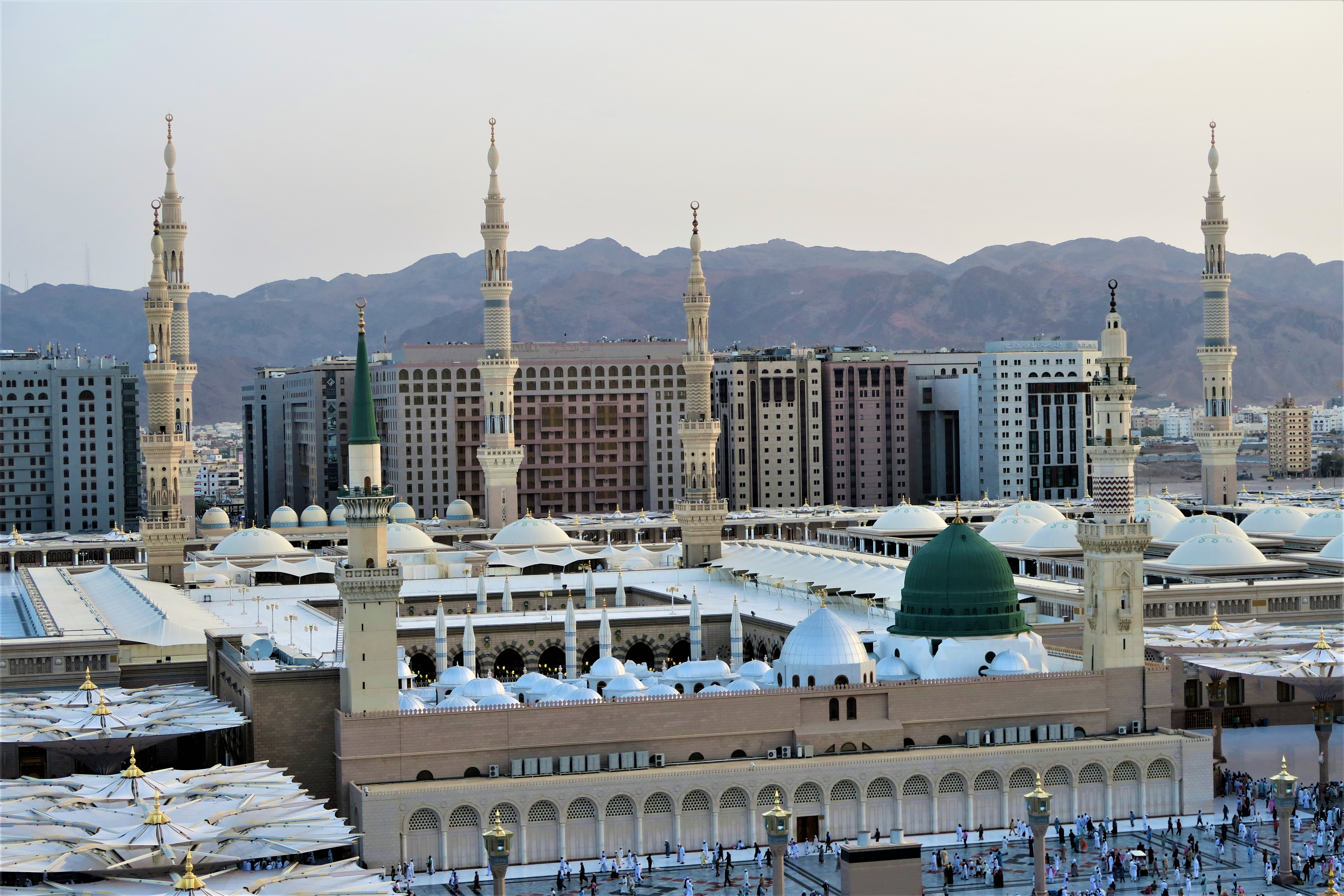
The Mosque of the Prophet, standing on the site of Muhammad's first mosque in Medina. The present-day building is the result of many reconstructions and expansions up to modern times.

The Islamic era began with the formation of Islam under the leadership of Muhammad in early 7th-century Arabia. The first mosque was a structure built by Muhammad in Medina in 622, right after his Hijrah (migration) from Mecca, which corresponds to the site of the present-day Mosque of the Prophet (al-Masjid an-Nabawi). It is usually described as his house, but may have been designed to serve as a community center from the beginning. It consisted of a simple courtyard structure built in unbaked brick, with a rectangular, almost square, floor plan measuring about 53 by 56 meters. A shaded portico supported by palm trunks stood on the north side of the courtyard (ṣaḥn), in the direction of prayer (the qibla), which was initially towards Jerusalem. When the qibla was changed to face towards Mecca in 624, a similar portico was added on the south side, facing towards that city. Muhammad and his family lived in separate rooms attached to the mosque, and Muhammad himself was buried in one of these rooms upon his death in 632. Over the rest of the 7th century and in the 8th century the mosque was repeatedly expanded to include a large flat-roofed prayer hall supported by columns (a hypostyle hall) with a central courtyard. It became one of the main models for the early mosques built elsewhere. Scholars generally agree that aside from Muhammad's mosque/house, the architecture of the Arabian Peninsula seems to have had only a limited role in the formulation of later Islamic architecture.

Prior to the start of the Arab-Muslim conquests of the 7th century, the two major powers in the Middle East and the eastern Mediterranean world were the Byzantine (Eastern Roman) Empire and the Sasanian Empire. These two empires both cultivated their own major architectural traditions. Occupying the borderlands between these two empires – in the desert and steppe regions of Syria, Palestine, Mesopotamia and northern Arabia – were two Arab tribal client states: the Lakhmids, who were clients of the Sasanians and had their capital at al-Hira (in present-day Iraq), and the Ghassanids, who were clients of the Byzantines and protected their eastern borders. These two Arab dynasties were significant patrons of architecture in their respective regions. Their architecture is not well understood due to the scarcity of identifiable remains today, but they borrowed and adapted the architecture of their Byzantine and Sasanian suzerains. Some of their buildings are known from archeology or historical texts, such as the Lakhmid palaces of Khawarnaq and al-Sadir in al-Hira, a Ghassanid church with mosaic decoration at Nitil (near Madaba), and a Ghassanid audience hall incorporated into the later Umayyad rural residence at ar-Rusafa. The culture and architecture of the Lakhmids and Ghassanids probably played a subsequent role in transmitting and filtering the architectural traditions of the Sasanian and the Byzantine/Roman worlds to the later Arab Islamic dynasties who established their political centers in the same regions.

When the early Arab-Muslim conquests spread out from the Arabian Peninsula in the 7th century and advanced across the Middle East and North Africa, new garrison cities were established in the conquered territories, such as Fustat in Egypt and Kufa in present-day Iraq. The central congregational mosques of these cities were built in the hypostyle format. In other cities, especially in Syria, new mosques were established by converting or occupying parts of existing churches in existing cities, as for example in Damascus and Hama. These early mosques had no minaret, although small shelters may have been constructed on the roofs to protect the muezzin while issuing the call to prayer.

=== Umayyad era ===
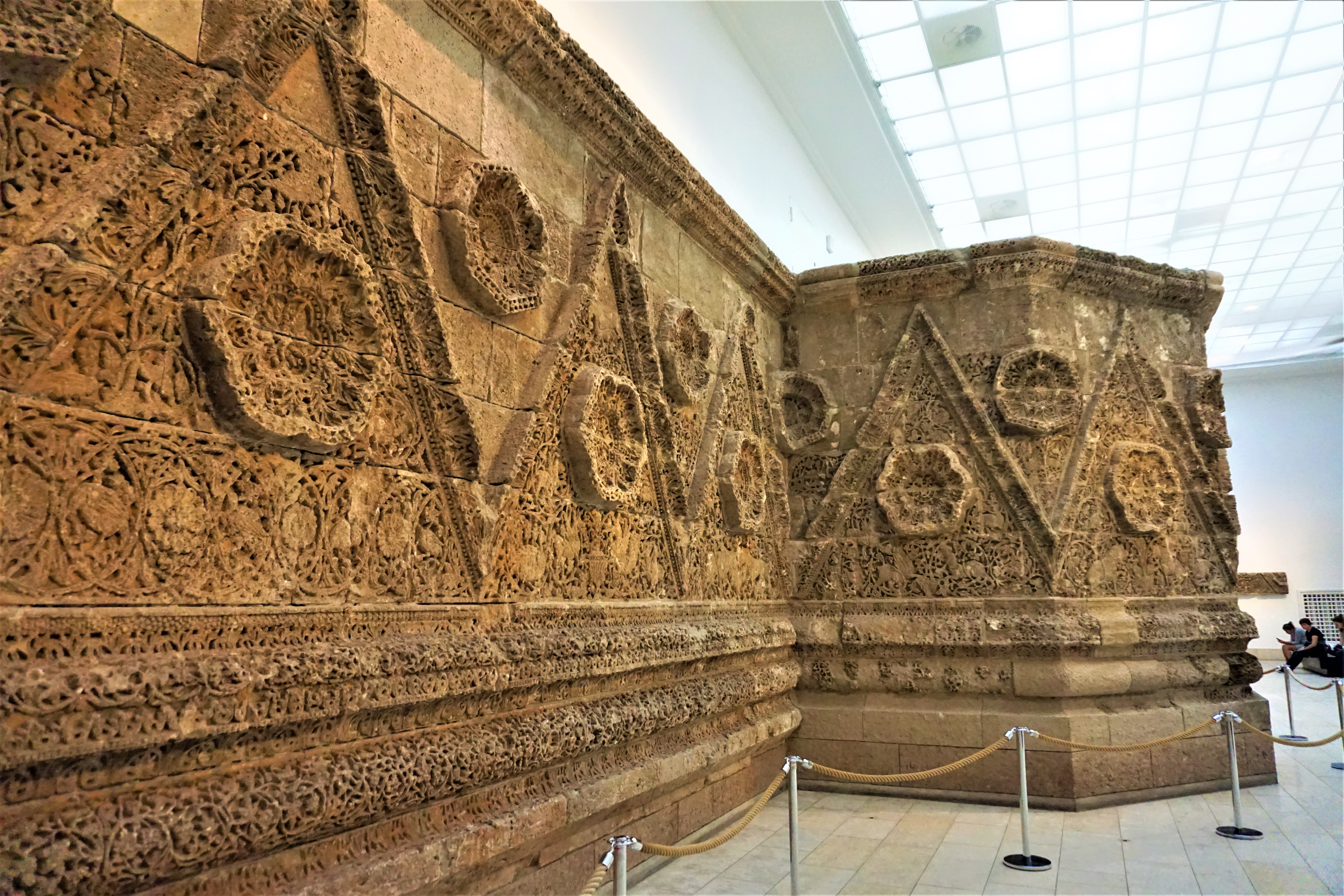
The Umayyad-era Mshatta Facade, from a palace near Amman, now in the Pergamon Museum in Berlin. The decoration displays Byzantine and Sasanian influences.

The Umayyad Caliphate (661–750) combined elements of Byzantine architecture and Sasanian architecture, but Umayyad architecture introduced new combinations of these styles. The reuse of elements from classical Roman and Byzantine art was still widely evident because political power and patronage was centered in Syria, a former Roman/Byzantine province. Some former Ghassanid structures also appear to have been reused and modified during this period. However, a significant amount of experimentation occurred as Umayyad patrons recruited craftsmen from across the empire and architects were allowed, or even encouraged, to mix elements from different artistic traditions and to disregard traditional conventions and restraints. Partly as a result of this, Umayyad architecture is distinguished by the extent and variety of decoration, including mosaics, wall painting, sculpture and carved reliefs. While figural scenes were notably present in monuments like Qusayr 'Amra, non-figural decoration and more abstract scenes became highly favoured, especially in religious architecture. The Umayyad period thus played a crucial role in transforming and enriching existing architectural traditions during the formation of early Islamic society's visual culture.

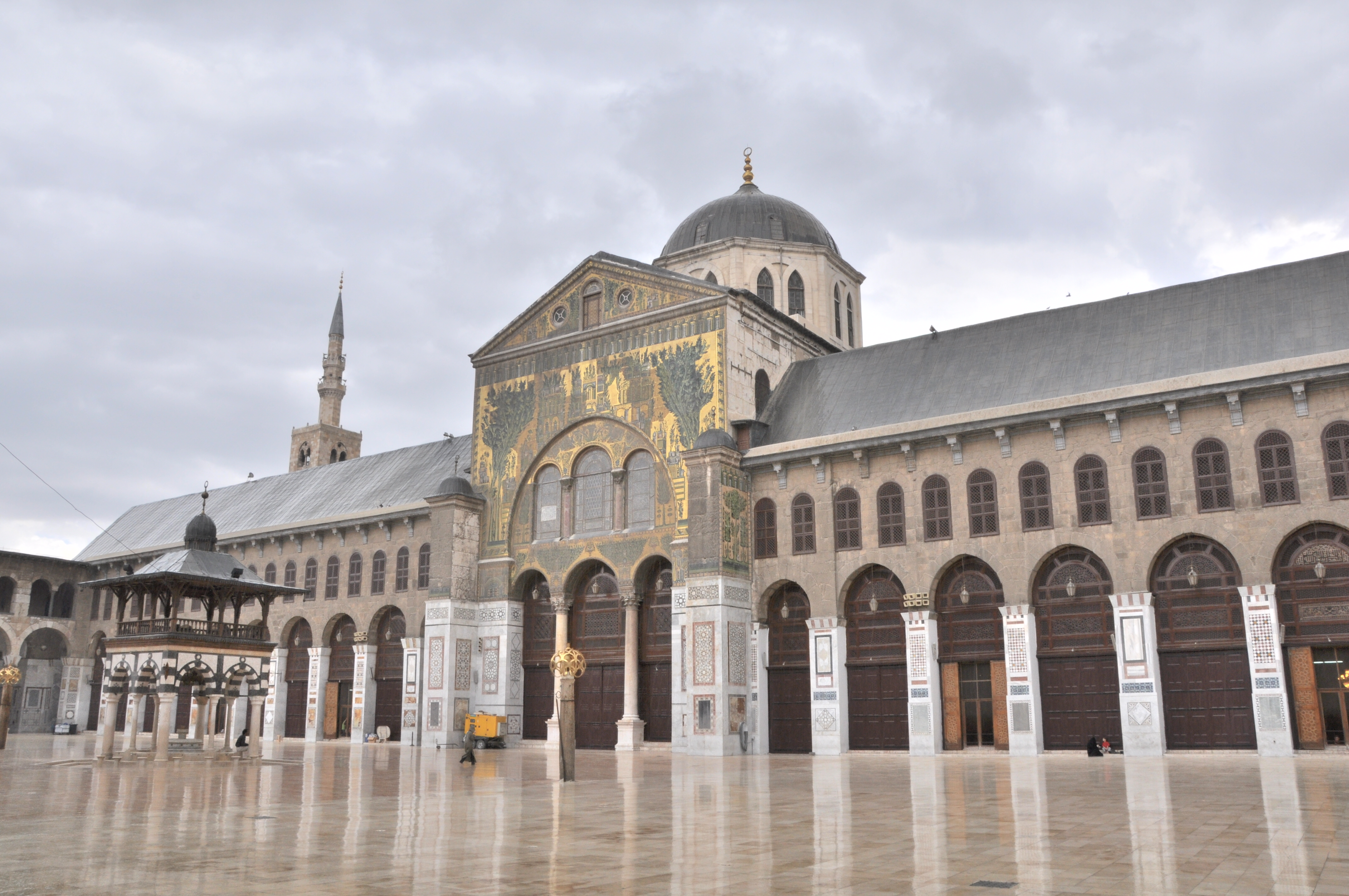
Great Mosque of Damascus (early 8th century)

The Umayyads were the first to add the mihrab to mosque design, a concave niche in the qibla wall of the mosque. The first mihrab reportedly appeared at Muhammad's mosque in Medina when it was rebuilt by al-Walid I in 707. It seems to have represented the place where Muhammad stood when leading prayer. This almost immediately became a standard feature of all mosques. Several major early monuments of Islamic architecture built under the Umayyads include the Dome of the Rock in Jerusalem (built by Caliph Abd al-Malik) and the Great Mosque of Damascus (built by al-Walid I). The Al-Aqsa Mosque on the Al-Aqsa compound, also in Jerusalem, was also rebuilt by al-Walid I, replacing an earlier simple structure built around 670. A number of palaces from this period have also partially survived or have been excavated in modern times. The horseshoe arch appears for the first time in Umayyad architecture, later to evolve to its most advanced form in al-Andalus (Iberian Peninsula).

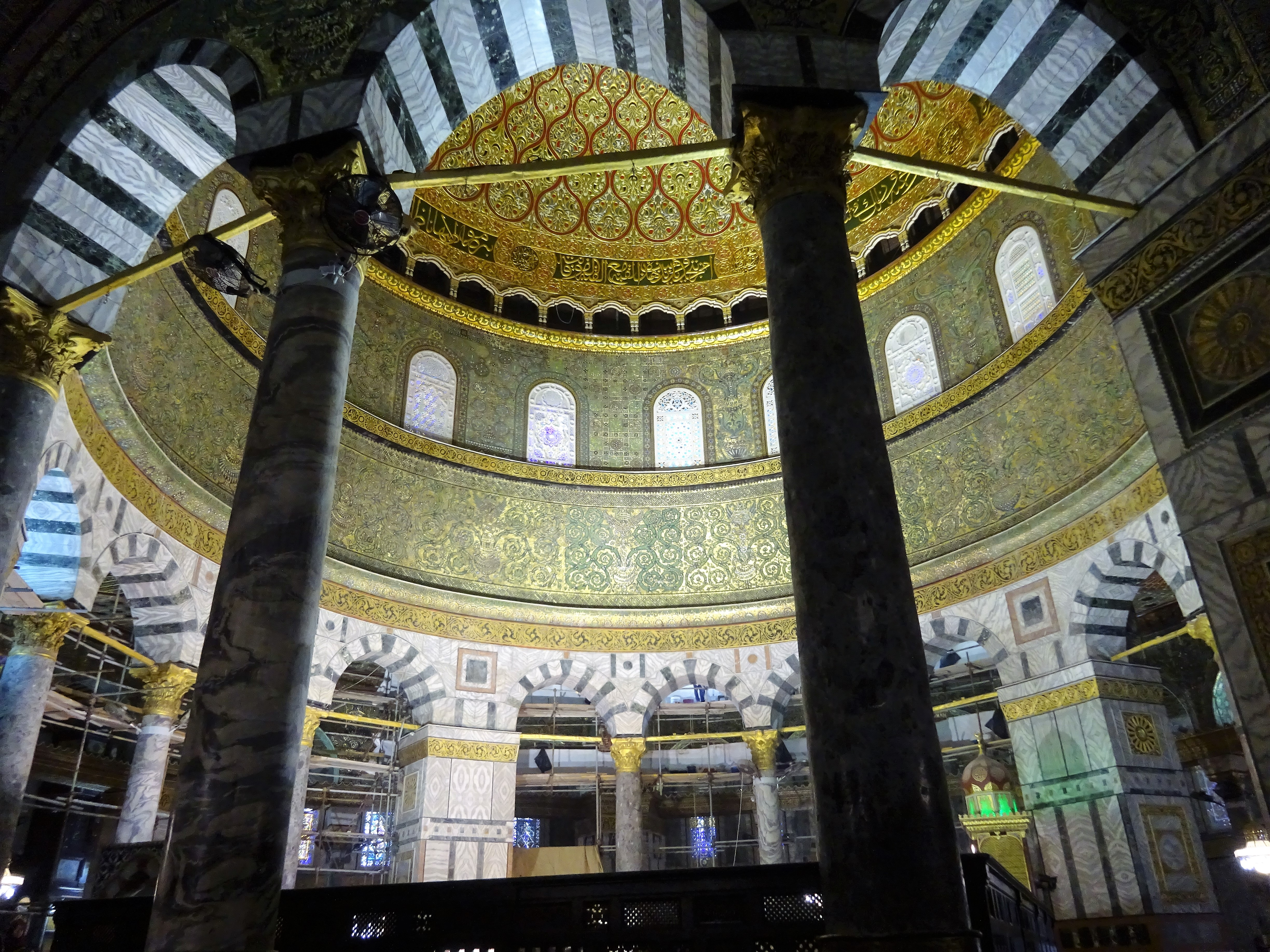
Interior of the Dome of the Rock in Jerusalem (late 7th century, with later renovations), including well-preserved mosaics from the Umayyad period (around the lower part of the dome).

The Dome of the Rock has a centralized floor plan with an octagonal layout. This was most likely modeled on earlier Byzantine martyria in the region that had a similar form, such as the Church of the Kathisma. Despite the religious and historical importance of the Dome of the Rock, its layout did not frequently serve as a model for major Islamic monuments after it. In hypostyle mosques, the Umayyads introduced the tradition of making the "nave" or aisle in front of the mihrab wider than the others, dividing the prayer room along its central axis. This innovation was probably inspired by the layout of existing Christian basilicas in the region. Both the al-Aqsa Mosque and the Great Mosque of Damascus feature a hypostyle hall in this fashion, with a dome above the space in front of the mihrab, and both were influential in the design of later mosques elsewhere. The Dome of the Rock and the Umayyad Mosque are also notable for their extensive program of mosaic decoration that drew on late antique motifs and craftsmanship. However, mosaic decoration eventually fell out of fashion in Islamic architecture.

=== Abbasid era ===
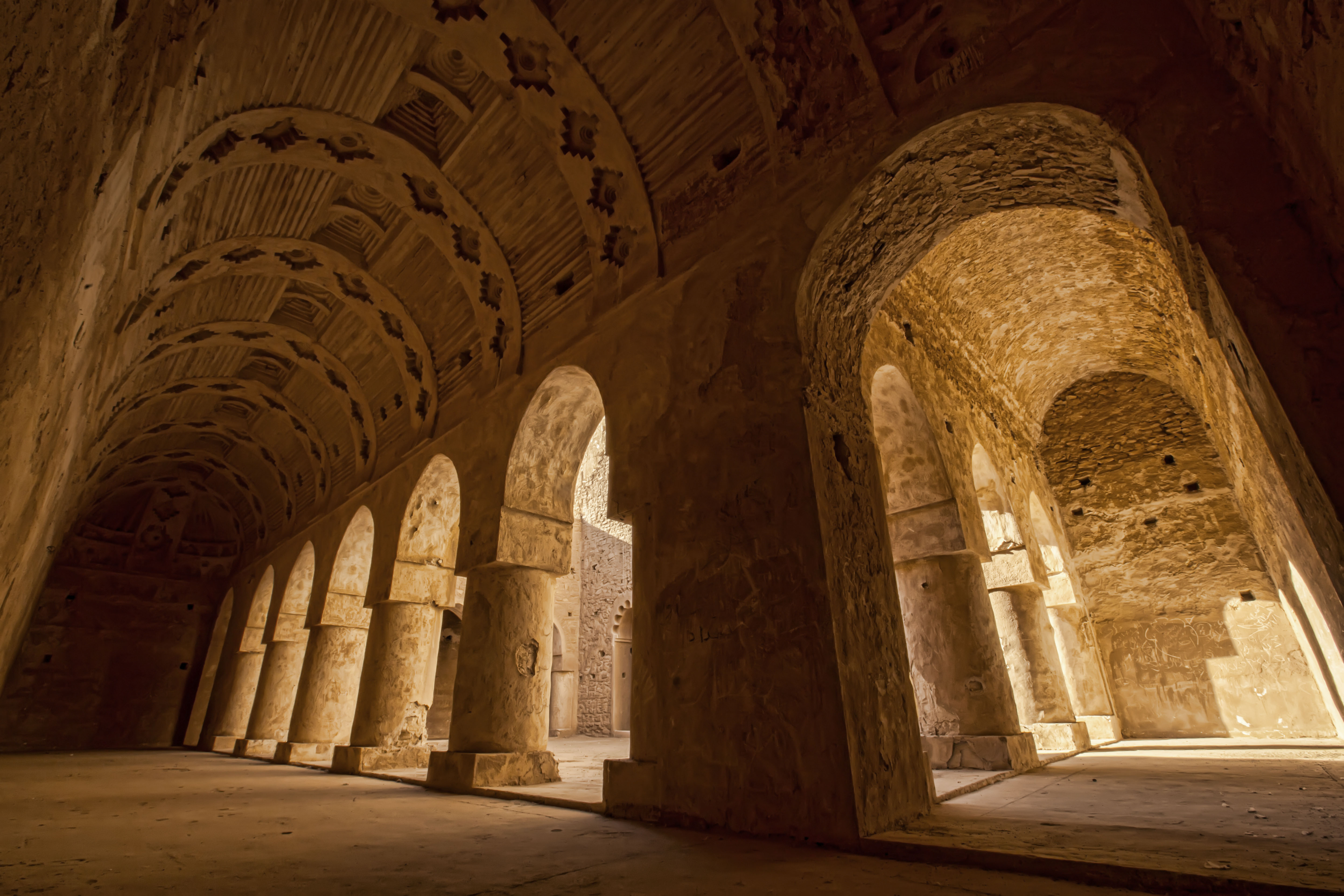
Interior of the al-Ukhaidir Palace (c. 775) in Iraq, one of the earliest surviving examples of Abbasid architecture

The Abbasid architecture of the Abbasid Caliphate (750–1513) was particularly influenced by Sasanian architecture, which in turn featured elements present since ancient Mesopotamia. Other influences such as ancient Soghdian architecture in Central Asia have also been noted. This was partly a result of the caliphate's political center shifting further east to the new capital of Baghdad, in present-day Iraq. The Abbasids also built other capital cities, such as Samarra in the 9th century, which is now a major archeological site that has provided numerous insights into the evolution of Islamic art and architecture during this time. During the Abbasid Caliphate's golden years in the 8th and 9th centuries, its great power and unity allowed architectural fashions and innovations to spread quickly to other areas of the Islamic world under its influence.

Multifoil (cusped) arches first appeared in Abbasid Samarra, featured in the exterior decoration of Qasr al-Ashiq (9th century)

Features from the late Umayyad period, such as vaulting, carved stucco, and painted wall decoration, were continued and elaborated in the Abbasid period. The four-centred arch, a more sophisticated form of the pointed arch, is first attested during the Abbasid period in monuments at Samarra, such as the Qasr al-Ashiq palace, and became widely used in some regions at later periods. Samarra also saw the appearance of new decorative styles, particularly in stucco and plasterwork, which rendered the earlier vegetal motifs of late antique traditions into more abstract and stylized forms, as exemplified by the so-called "beveled" style. These decorative techniques quickly spread to other regions where stucco decoration played a prominent role.

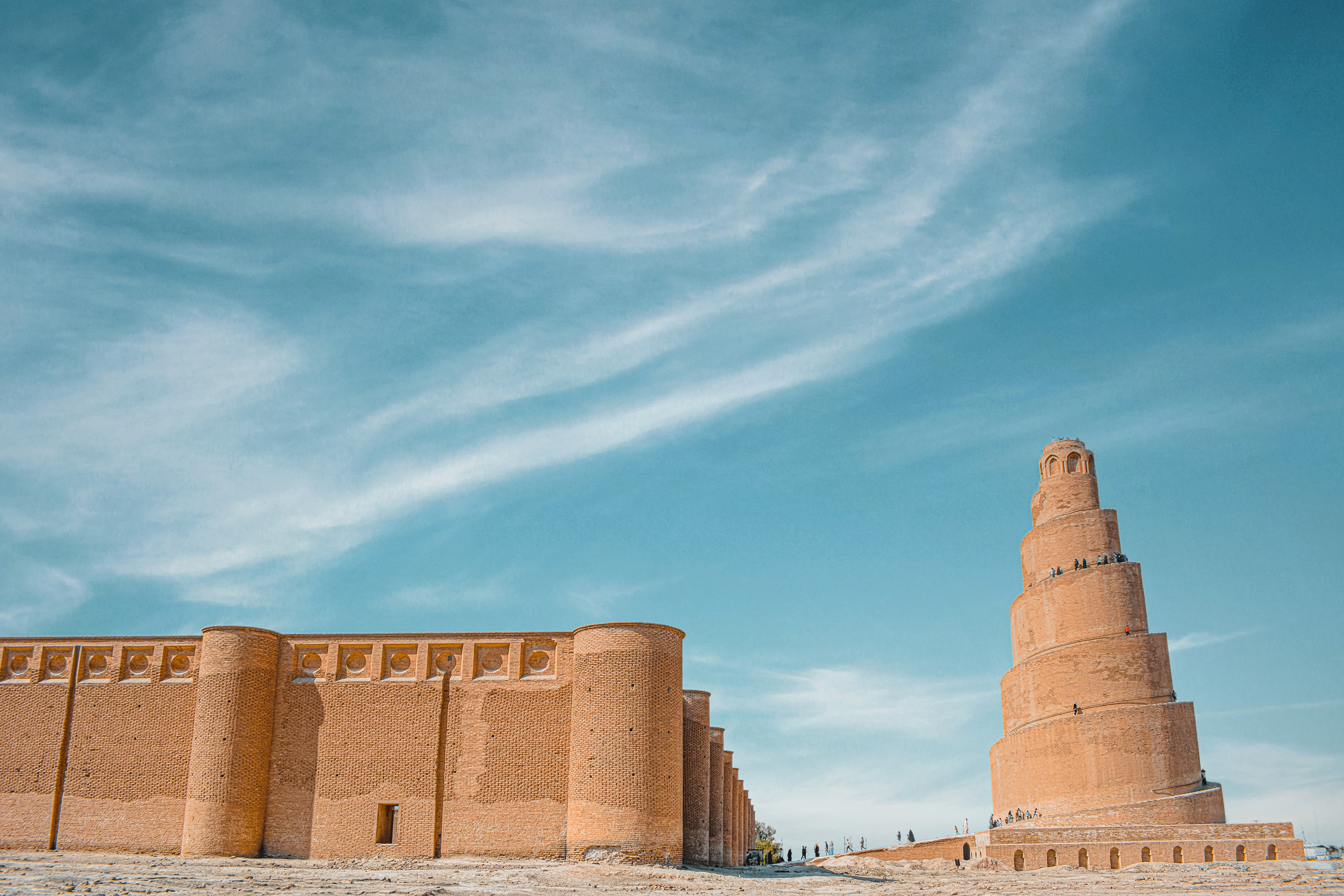
The walls and minaret of the Great Mosque of Samarra built by the Abbasids in the 9th century

Abbasid mosques all followed the courtyard plan with hypostyle halls. The earliest was the Great Mosque that Caliph al-Mansur built in Baghdad (since destroyed). The Great Mosque of Samarra built by al-Mutawakkil measured 256 by 139 metres (840 by 456 ft), had a flat wooden roof supported by columns, and was decorated with marble panels and glass mosaics. The prayer hall of the Abu Dulaf Mosque at Samarra had arcades on rectangular brick piers running at right angles to the qibla wall. Both of the Samarra mosques have spiral minarets, the only examples in Iraq. A mosque at Balkh in what is now Afghanistan was about 20 by 20 metres (66 by 66 ft) square, with three rows of three square bays, supporting nine vaulted domes.

While the origins of the minaret are uncertain, it is believed that the first true minarets appeared in this period. Several of the Abbasid mosques built in the early ninth century had minaret towers which stood at the northern ends of the building, opposite the central mihrab. Among the most famous of these is the Malwiyya minaret, a stand-alone tower with a "spiral" form built for the Great Mosque of Samarra.

=== Early regional styles ===
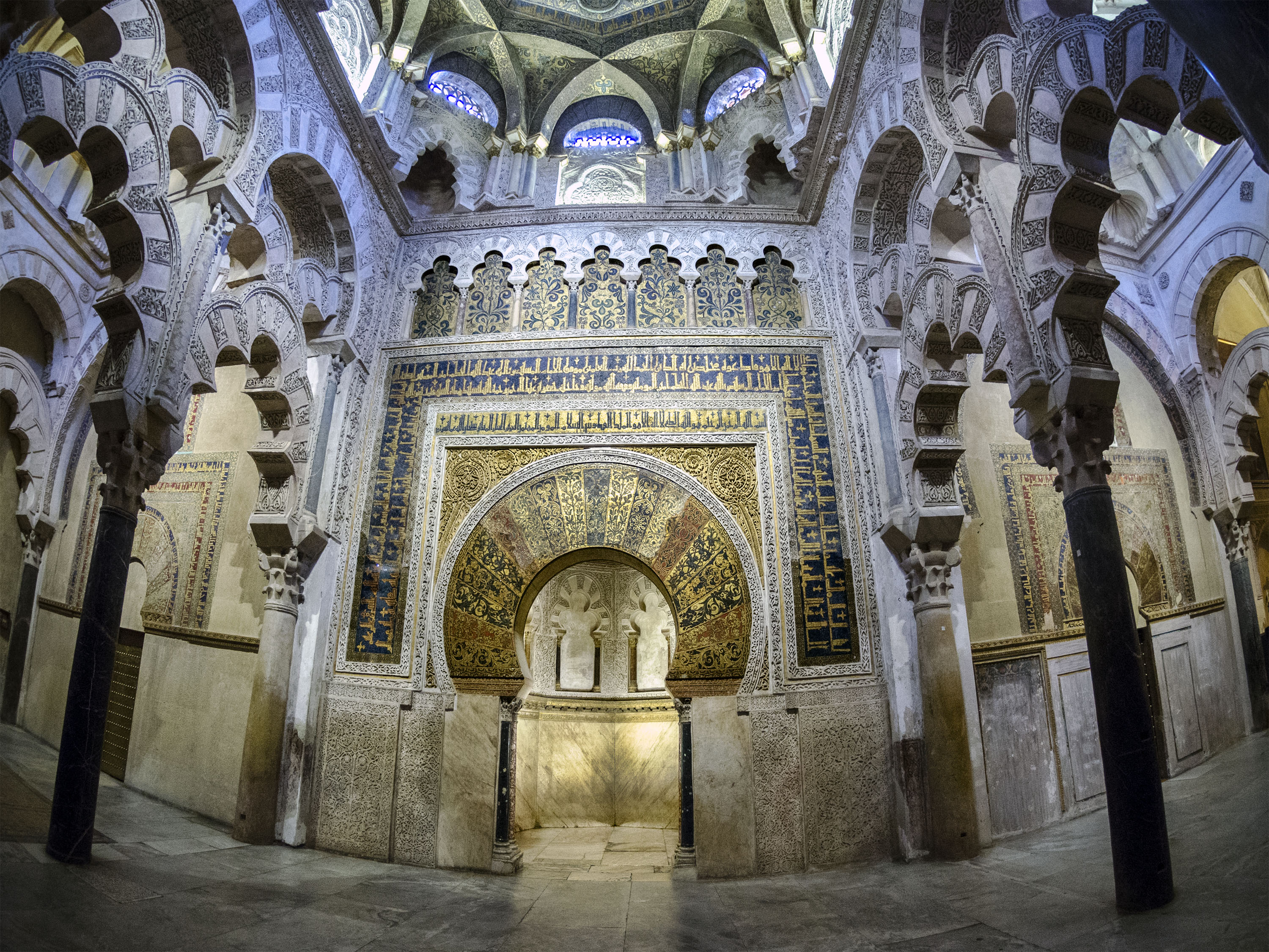
The mihrab and maqsura area of the Great Mosque of Córdoba, added to the mosque by al-Hakam II (late 10th century), during the Caliphate of Cordóba

After the overthrow of the Umayyad Caliphate in 750 by the Abbasids, a new branch of the Umayyad dynasty succeeded in taking control of al-Andalus in 756, founding the Emirate of Córdoba and reaching the apogee of its power as self-declared caliphs in the 10th century. The Great Mosque of Córdoba, built in 785–786, marks the earliest major monument of Moorish architecture in the Iberian Peninsula. This style of architecture established in al-Andalus was also largely shared with the architecture of western North Africa (the Maghreb), from which later empires in the region would also emerge and contribute to its artistic evolution. The original Great Mosque of Córdoba was noted for its unique hypostyle hall with rows of double-tiered, two-coloured arches that were repeated and maintained in later extensions of the building. The mosque was expanded multiple times, with the expansion by al-Hakam II (r. 961–976) introducing important aesthetic innovations such as interlacing arches and ribbed domes, which were imitated and elaborated in later monuments in the region. The construction of Madinat al-Zahra, a new capital and monumental palace-city in the 10th century, also created an important complex of royal architecture and patronage. Smaller monuments such as the Bab al-Mardum Mosque in Toledo and the minarets added to the Qarawiyyin and Andalusiyyin mosques in Fez (present-day Morocco) demonstrate the prevalence of the same stylistic elements across the region.

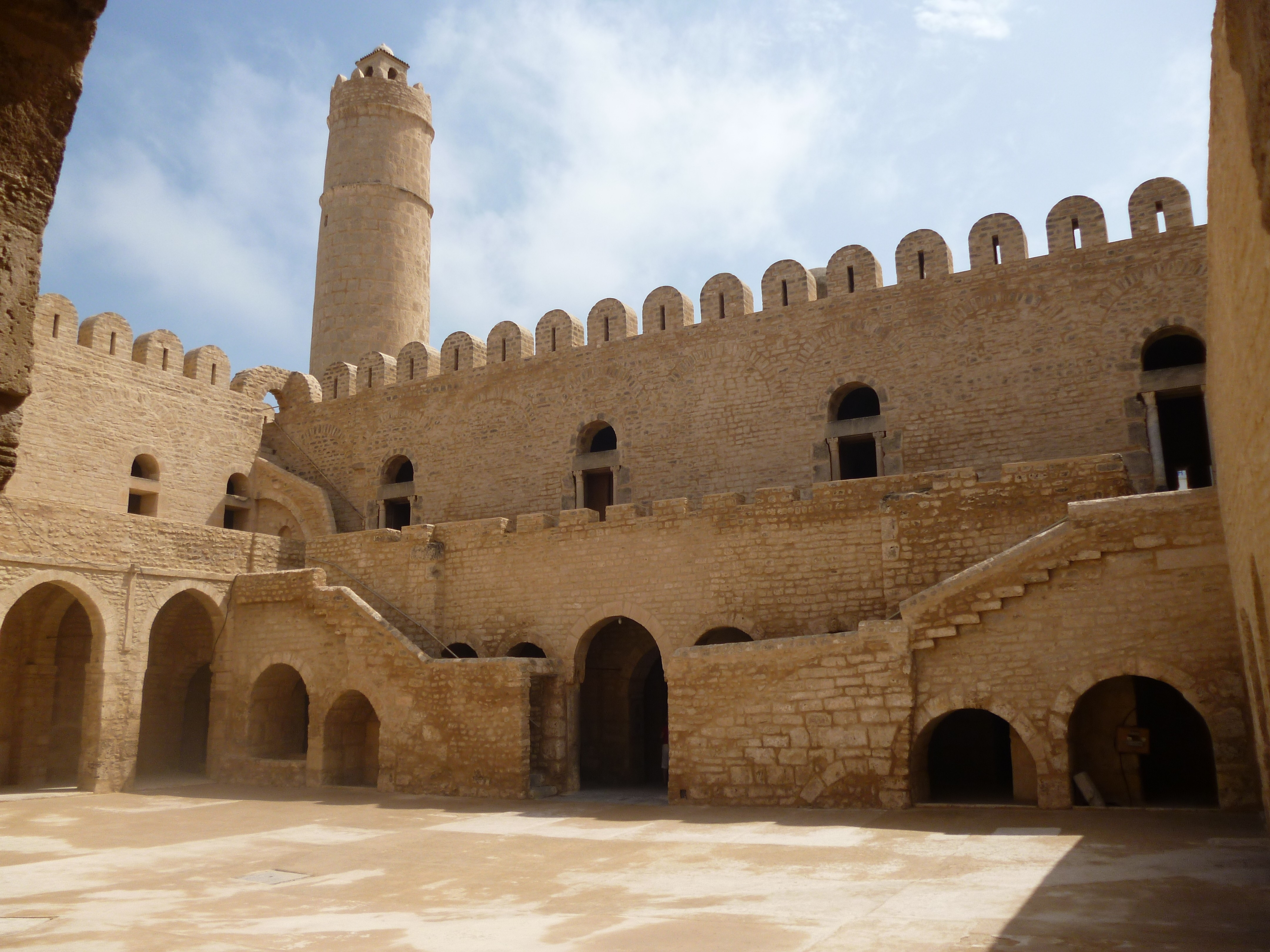
Ribat of Sousse in Sousse built by the Aghlabids (late 8th or early 9th century)

After its initial apogee of power, the Abbasid Caliphate became partly fragmented into regional states in the 9th century which were formally obedient to the caliphs in Baghdad but were de facto independent. The Aghlabids in Ifriqiya (roughly modern-day Tunisia) were notable patrons of architecture themselves, responsible for rebuilding both the Great Mosque of Kairouan (originally founded by Uqba ibn Nafi in 670) and the Zaytuna Mosque of Tunis in much of their current forms, as well as for building numerous other structures in the region. In Egypt, Ahmad ibn Tulun established a short-lived dynasty, the Tulunids, and built himself a new capital (al-Qata'i) with a new congregational mosque, known as the Ibn Tulun Mosque, which was completed in 879. It was strongly influenced by Abbasid architecture in Samarra and remains one of the most notable and best-preserved examples of 9th-century architecture from the Abbasid Caliphate.

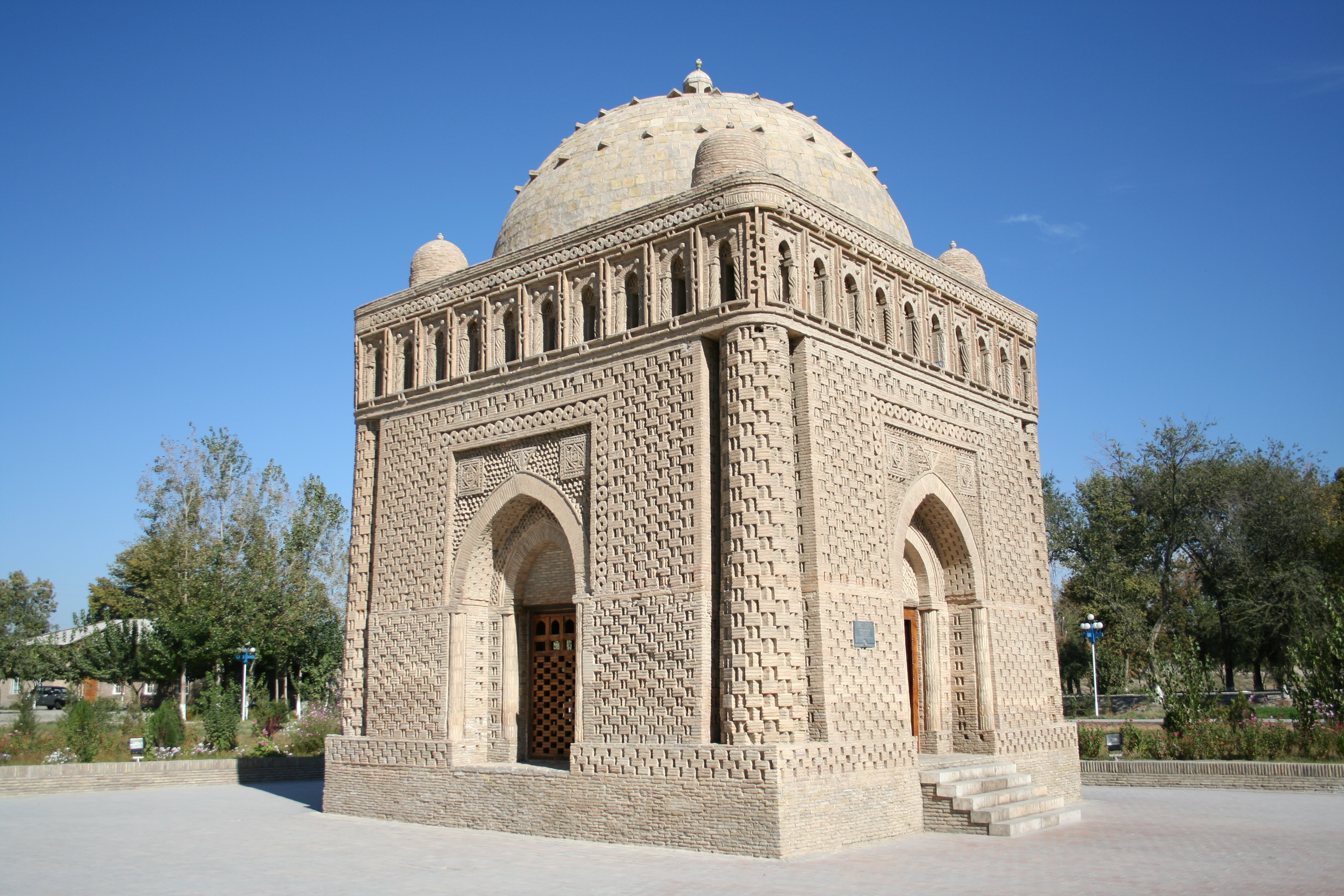
The Samanid Mausoleum in Bukhara (10th century), built entirely of brick, is one of the oldest monumental tombs in the Islamic world.

In Iran and Central Asia, a number of other local and regional dynasties held sway prior to the arrival of the Seljuks in the 11th century. By the 10th century, central Iran and the Abbasid heartland of Iraq were under the de facto rule of the Buyid dynasty, northern Iran was ruled by the Bawandids and Ziyarids, and the northeastern regions of Khurasan and Transoxiana were ruled by the Samanids. It is around this period that many of the distinctive features of subsequent Iranian and Central Asian architecture first emerged, including the use of baked brick for both construction and decoration, the use of glazed tile for surface decoration, and the development of muqarnas from squinches. Hypostyle mosques continued to be built and there is also evidence of multi-domed mosques, though most were modified or rebuilt in later eras. The Jameh Mosque of Na'in, one of the oldest surviving congregational mosques in Iran, contains some of the best-preserved features from this period, including decorative brickwork, Kufic inscriptions, and rich stucco decoration featuring vine scrolls and acanthus leaves that draw from the earlier styles of Samarra. Another important architectural trend to arise in the 10th to 11th centuries is the development of mausolea, which took on monumental forms for the first time. One type of mausoleum was the tomb tower, such as the Gunbad-i-Qabus (circa 1006–7), while the other main type was the domed square, such as the Tomb of the Samanids in Bukhara (before 943).

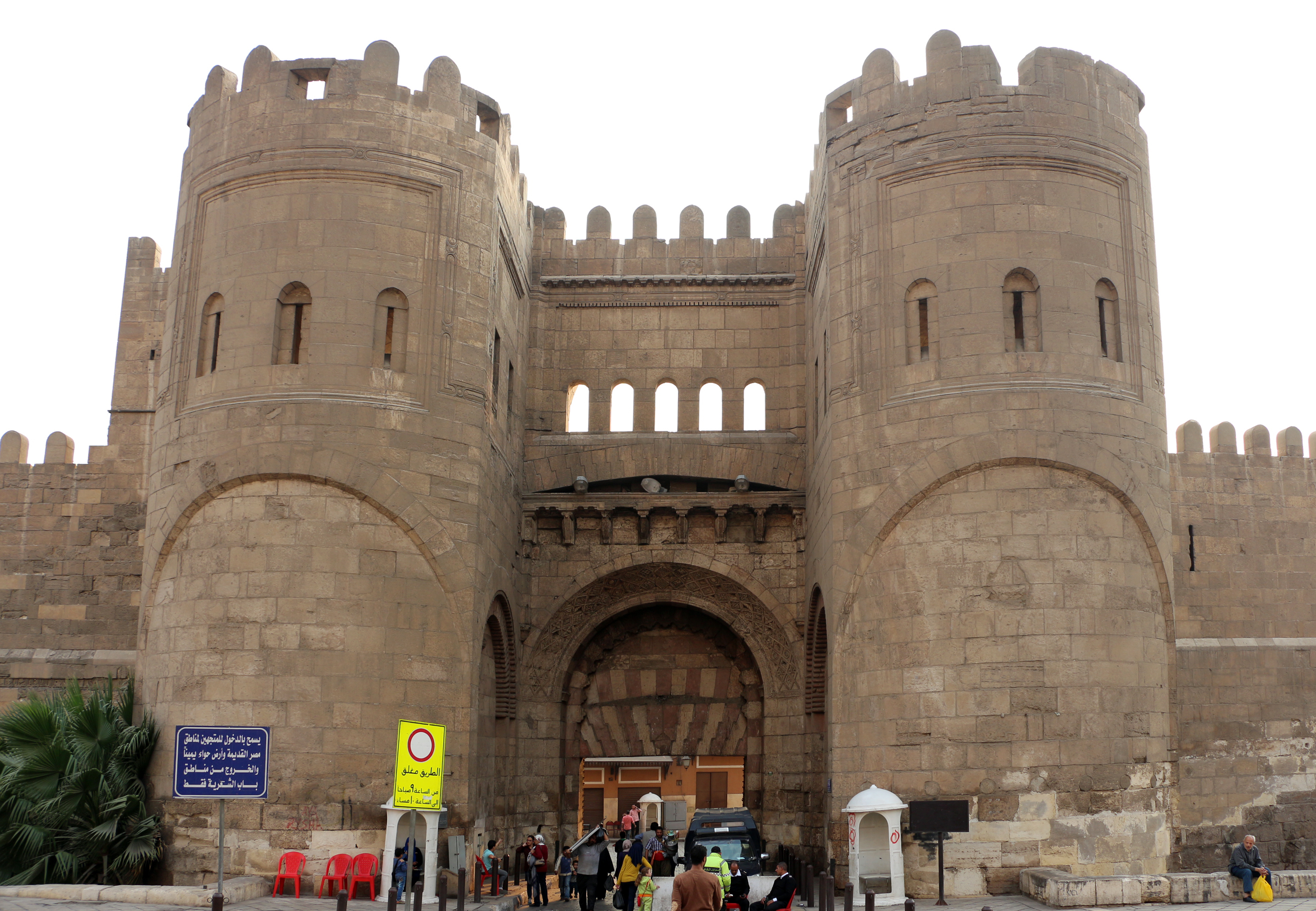
Bab al-Futuh in Cairo, one of the gates built by the Fatimid vizier Badr al-Jamali (11th century)

In the 10th century, the Fatimid Caliphate rose to power in Ifriqiya, where it built a new fortified capital at Mahdia. In 970, the Fatimids moved their center of power to Egypt and founded another capital, Cairo. Fatimid architecture in Egypt followed Tulunid techniques and used similar materials, but also developed its own features. The first Fatimid congregational mosque in Cairo was al-Azhar Mosque, founded at the same time as the city (970), which became the spiritual center for the Ismaili Shi'a branch of Islam. Other notable monuments include the large Mosque of al-Hakim (founded in 990 under al-'Aziz but completed around 1013 under al-Hakim), the small Aqmar Mosque (1125) with its richly decorated street façade, and the domed Mashhad of Sayyida Ruqayya (1133), notable for its mihrab of elaborately carved stucco. Under the powerful vizier Badr al-Jamali (r. 1073–1094), the city walls were rebuilt in stone along with several monumental gates, three of which have survived to the present-day: Bab al-Futuh, Bab al-Nasr, and Bab Zuweila).

== Characteristics ==
=== Courtyards ===
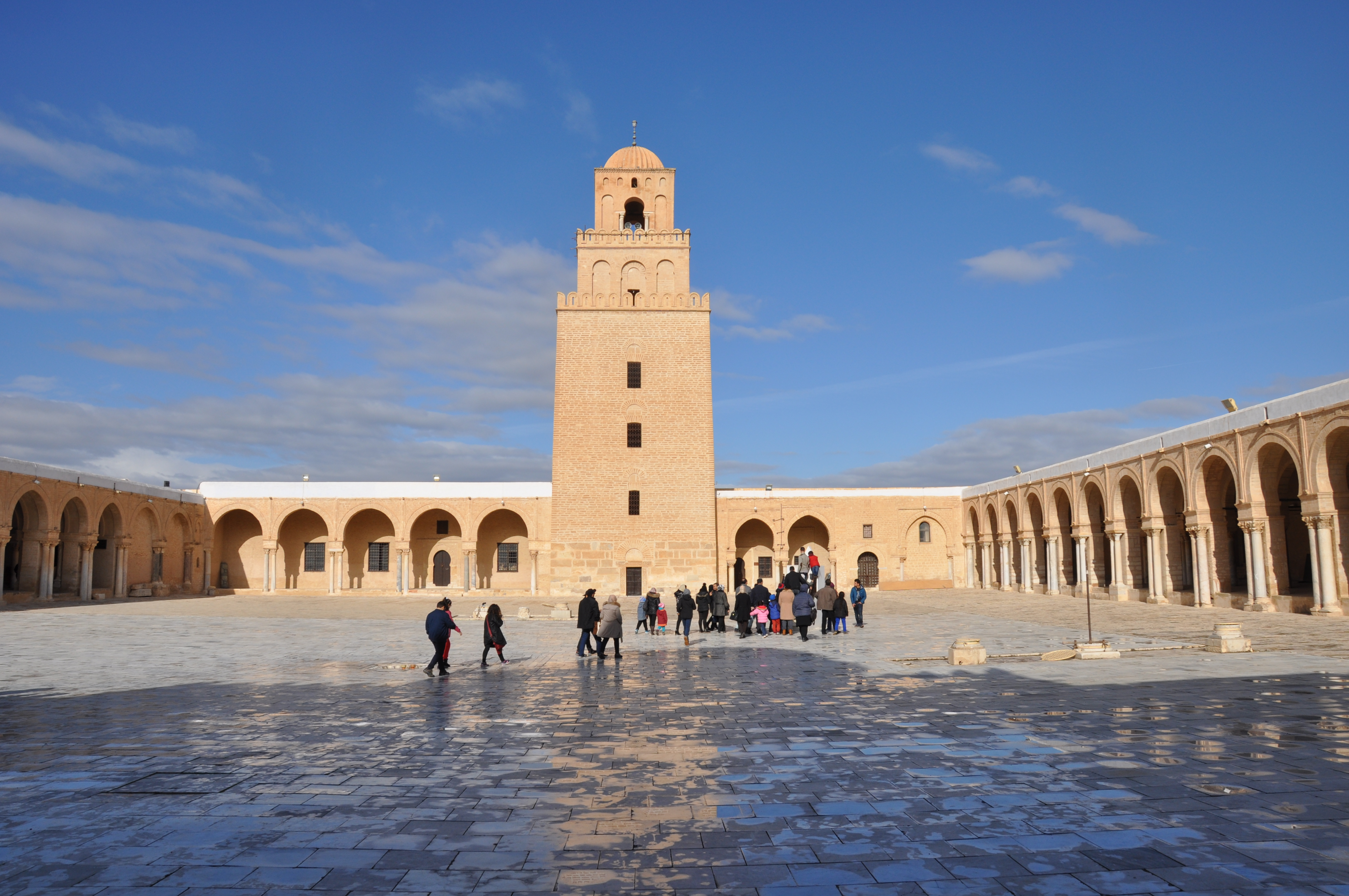
The sahn (courtyard) and minaret of the Great Mosque of Kairouan, Tunisia

Courtyards are a common element in the architecture of the Muslim world. Residences and other secular buildings typically contain a central private courtyard or walled garden. This was also called the wast ad-dar ("middle of the house") in Arabic. The tradition of courtyard houses was already widespread in the ancient Mediterranean world and Middle East, as seen in Greco-Roman houses (e.g. the Roman domus). The use of this space included the aesthetic effects of plants and water, the penetration of natural light, allowing breezes and air circulation into the structure during summer heat, as a cooler space with water and shade, and as a protected and proscribed place where the women of the house need not be covered in the hijab clothing traditionally necessary in public.

A ṣaḥn (Arabic: صحن) is the formal courtyard found in almost every major mosque. The courtyards are open to the sky and surrounded on all sides by structures with halls and rooms, and often a shaded semi-open arcade riwaq. A mosque courtyard is used for performing ablutions and as a patio for rest or gathering. Sahns usually feature a central pool or fountain to aid with ablutions, sometimes sheltered under an open domed pavilion. Historically, because of the warm Mediterranean and Middle Eastern climates, the courtyard also served to accommodate larger numbers of worshippers during Friday prayers.

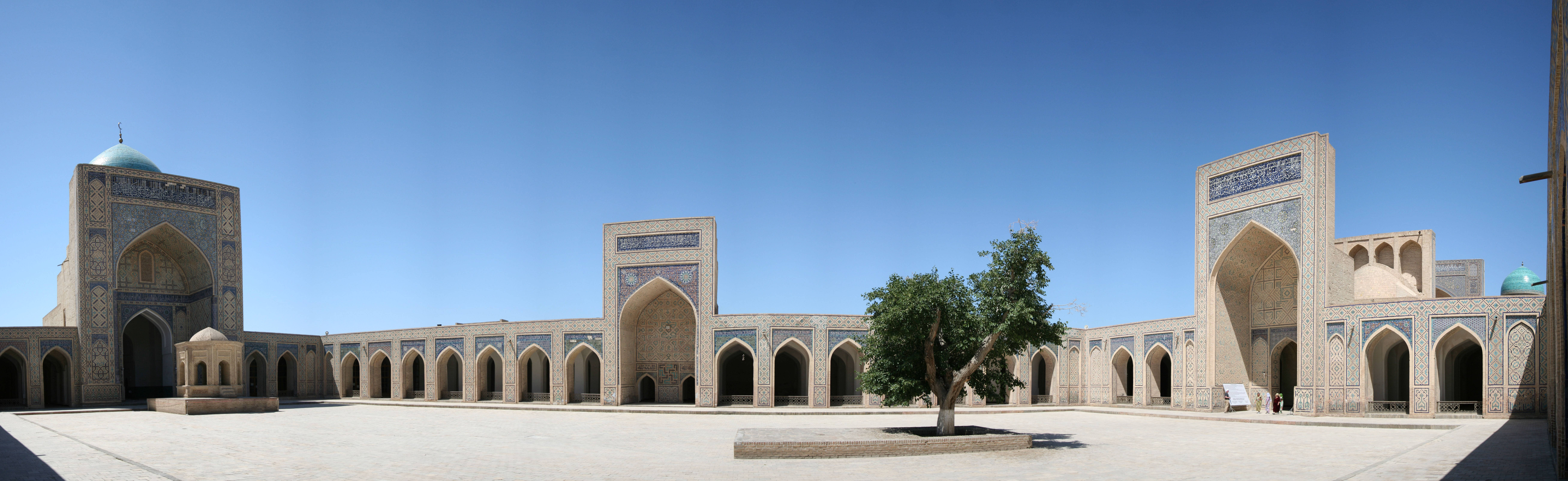
Courtyard of the Kalyan Mosque, part of the Po-i-Kalyan complex in Bukhara, Uzbekistan (16th century)

=== Hypostyle hall ===
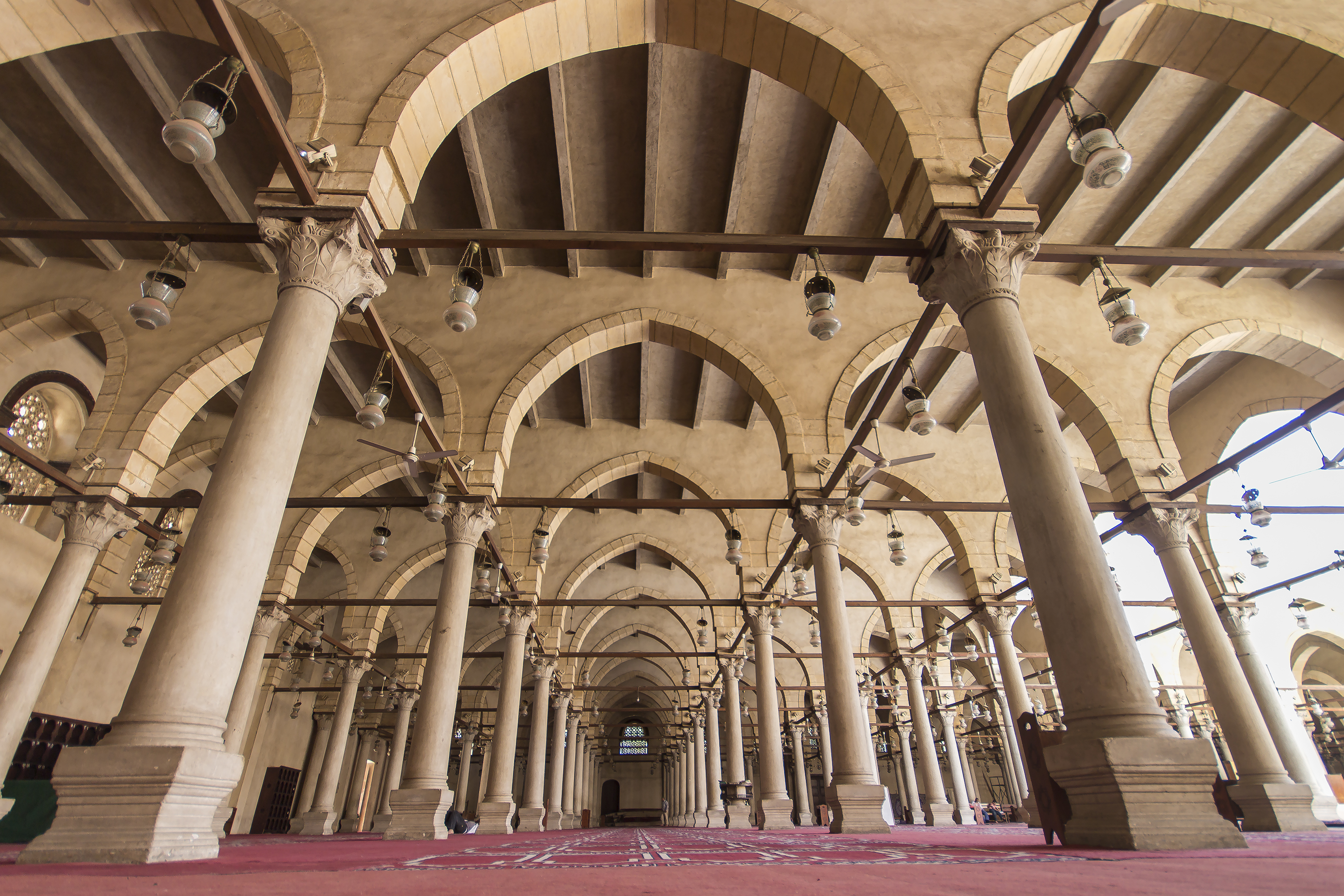
Hypostyle prayer hall of the present-day Amr ibn al-As Mosque, Cairo, consisting of a wide space covered by a roof supported on columns

A hypostyle, i.e., an open hall supported by columns, is considered to be derived from architectural traditions of Achaemenid period Persian assembly halls (apadana). This type of building originated from the Roman-style basilica with an adjacent courtyard surrounded by colonnades, like Trajan's Forum in Rome. The Roman type of building has developed out of the Greek agora. In Islamic architecture, the hypostyle hall is the main feature of the hypostyle mosque. Some scholars refer to the early hypostyle mosque with courtyard as the "Arab plan" or "Arab-type" mosque.

An early model of the hypostyle mosque was the Prophet's Mosque in Medina, which was expanded into this form during the 7th and early 8th century and influenced the form of early mosques. Further mosques of this type were constructed under the Umayyad and Abbasid dynasties; subsequently, however, the simplicity of this type of plan limited the opportunities for further development, and as a result, these mosques gradually fell out of popularity in some regions.

=== Vaulting ===
==== Umayyad diaphragm arches and barrel vaults ====
Diaphragm arches in Qasr Kharana, Jordan

In their vaulting structures, Umayyad period buildings show a mixture of ancient Roman and Persian architectural traditions. Diaphragm arches with lintelled ceilings made of wood or stone beams, or, alternatively, with barrel vaults, were known in the Levant since the classical and Nabatean period. They were mainly used to cover houses and cisterns. The architectural form of covering diaphragm arches with barrel vaults, however, was likely newly introduced from Iranian architecture, as similar vaulting was not known in the Levant (Bilad al-Sham) before the arrival of the Umayyads. However, this form was well known in Iran from early Parthian times, as exemplified in the Parthian buildings of Aššur. The earliest known example for barrel vaults resting on diaphragm arches from Umayyad architecture is known from Qasr Kharana in Syria. During the early period, the diaphragm arches are built from coarsely cut limestone slabs, without using supporting falsework, which were connected by gypsum mortar. Later-period vaults were erected using pre-formed lateral ribs modelled from gypsum, which served as a temporal formwork to guide and center the vault. These ribs, which were left in the structure afterwards, do not carry any load. The ribs were cast in advance on strips of cloth, the impression of which can still be seen in the ribs today. Similar structures are known from Sasanian architecture, for example from the palace of Firuzabad. Umayyad-period vaults of this type were found in Amman Citadel and in Qusayr 'Amra.

==== Iwans ====
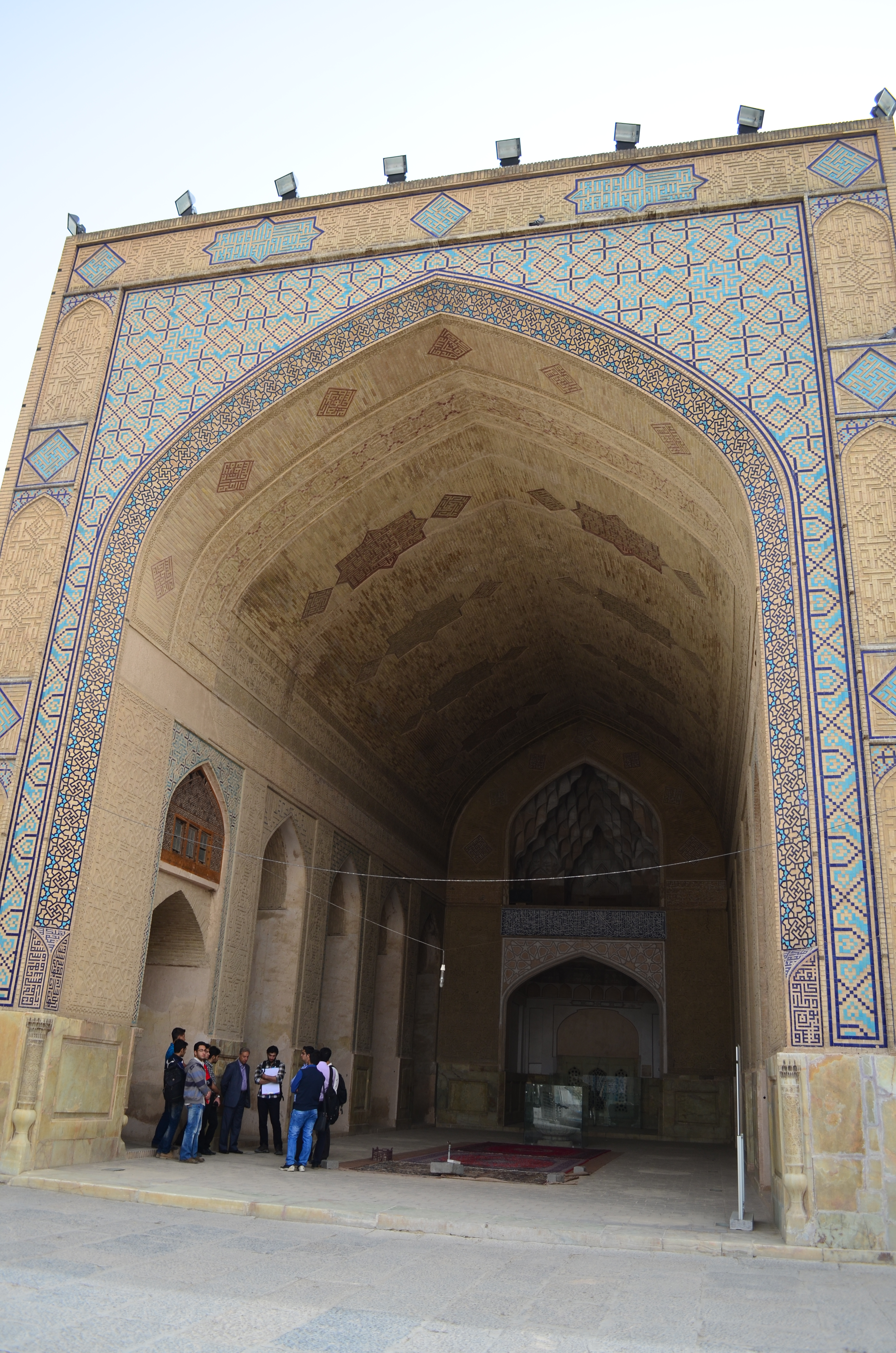
An iwan in the Jameh Mosque of Isfahan

An iwan is a hall that is walled on three sides and open on one side. It is typically covered by a vault although this can vary. This feature was present in Sasanian architecture, though its exact origins are older and still debated. It was later incorporated into Islamic architecture. Its usage became more common and widespread under the Seljuks in the 10th century. Iwans were used in a variety of ways and arranged in varying positions in relation to the rest of the building. They are found in many types of buildings including mosques, madrasas, palaces, and caravanserais. A common layout is the four-iwan plan.

The related Persian term, pishtaq, means the entrance portal (sometimes an iwan) projecting from the façade of a building, often decorated with calligraphy bands, glazed tilework, and geometric designs.

=== Domes ===
==== Early Islamic domes in the Levant ====
Dome in Qusayr 'Amra, Jordan, with remains of a fresco depicting constellations of the zodiac

Domes served both religious and secular purposes in late antique and early Islamic architecture, often carrying cosmological significance and symbolizing sacred or royal spaces. In early Islamic architecture, they appeared in the Great Mosque of Damascus, where the dome marking the space before the mihrab may have reflected the mosque’s special status as the caliphal capital. This is particularly notable given that earlier mosques at Wasit, Kufa, and Basra lacked domes, as did the Prophet’s Mosque in Medina following its reconstruction under the Umayyad caliph al-Walid I. Domes also featured prominently in early Islamic royal complexes, including Qusayr 'Amra and Hisham's Palace (Khirbat Al-Mafjar). The Umayyad palace in Damascus was known as Qasr al-Khadra (‘the Green Palace’), a name derived from its distinctive green dome.

==== Domes in Iran and Central Asia ====
Because of its long history of building and re-building, spanning the time from the Abbasids to the Qajar dynasty, and its excellent state of conservation, the Jameh Mosque of Isfahan provides an overview over the experiments Islamic architects conducted with complicated vaulting structures.

The system of squinches, which is a construction filling in the upper angles of a square room so as to form a base to receive an octagonal or spherical dome, was already known in Sasanian architecture. The spherical triangles of the squinches were split up into further subdivisions or systems of niches, resulting in a complex interplay of supporting structures forming an ornamental spatial pattern which hides the weight of the structure.

The tradition of double-shelled brick domes in Iran has been traced back to the 11th century. At the beginning of the 15th century, major Timurid monuments like the Gur-i Amir Mausoleum and the Bibi Khanum Mosque (both completed around 1404) were notable in their use of large double-shelled domes. These domes were composed of an inner shell which was visible from the interior and a larger outer shell, visible from the exterior and often of a slightly different shape. The Gur-i Amir Mausoleum's dome, the oldest one to have survived to the present day, features an exterior ribbed profile with a band of muqarnas around its drum. However, domes of this shape and style were likely constructed earlier, as evidenced by the Sultaniyya Mausoleum in Cairo, which was built earlier in the 1350s and appears to have copied this same design from the Iranian tradition.

The "non-radial rib vault", an architectural form of ribbed vaults with a superimposed spherical dome, is the characteristic architectural vault form of the Islamic East. From its beginnings in the Jameh Mosque of Isfahan, this form of vault was used in a sequence of important buildings up to the period of Safavid architecture. Its main characteristics are:

- four intersecting ribs, at times redoubled and intersected to form an eight-pointed star;
- the omission of a transition zone between the vault and the supporting structure;
- a central dome or roof lantern on top of the ribbed vault.

While intersecting pairs of ribs from the main decorative feature of Seljuk architecture, the ribs were hidden behind additional architectural elements in later periods, as exemplified in the dome of the Tomb of Ahmed Sanjar in Merv, until they finally disappeared completely behind the double shell of a stucco dome, as seen in the dome of Ālī Qāpū in Isfahan.

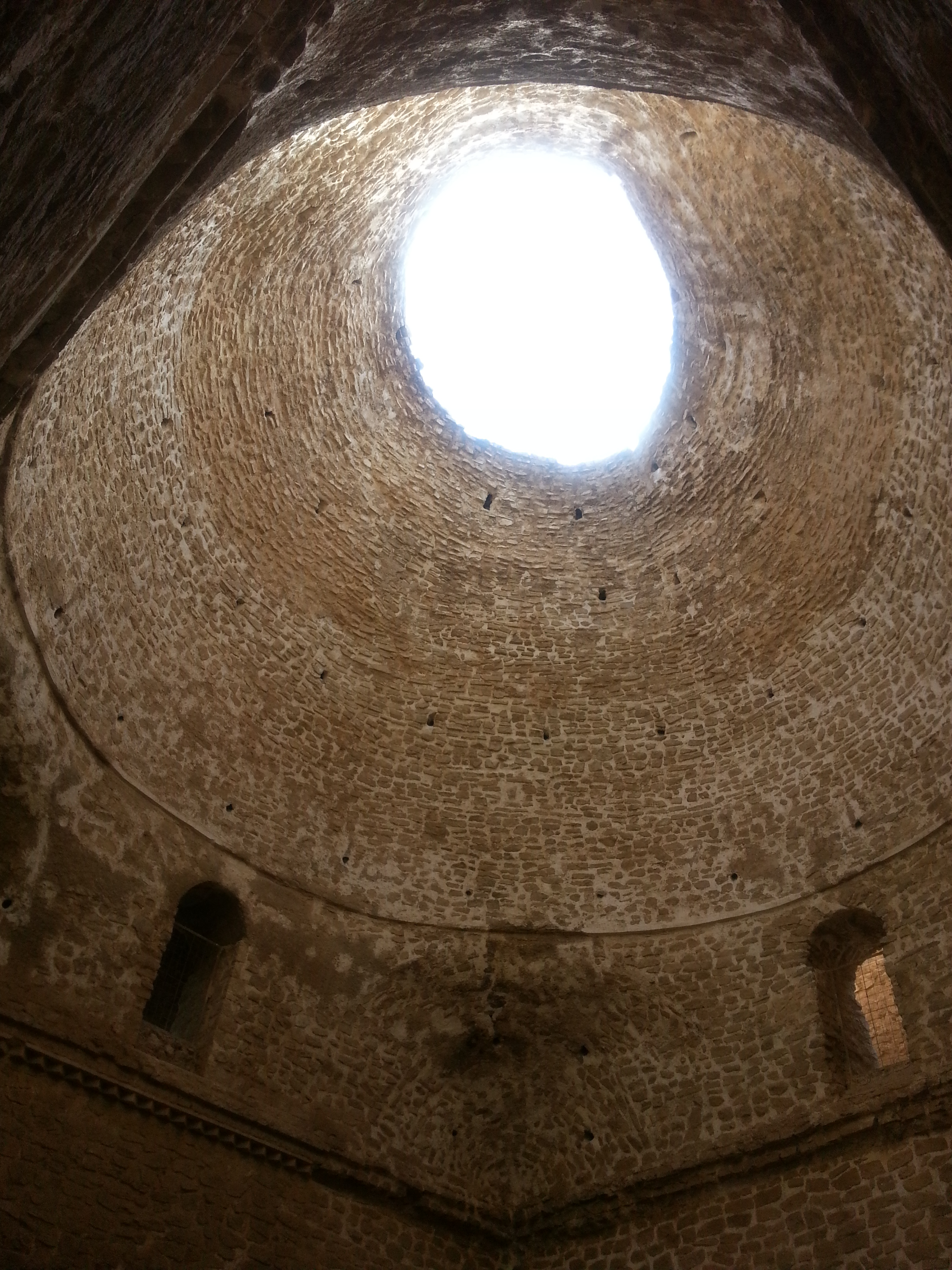
Dome with squinches in the Palace of Ardashir of pre-Islamic Persia. Squinches are one of the most significant Sasanian contribution to Islamic architecture.

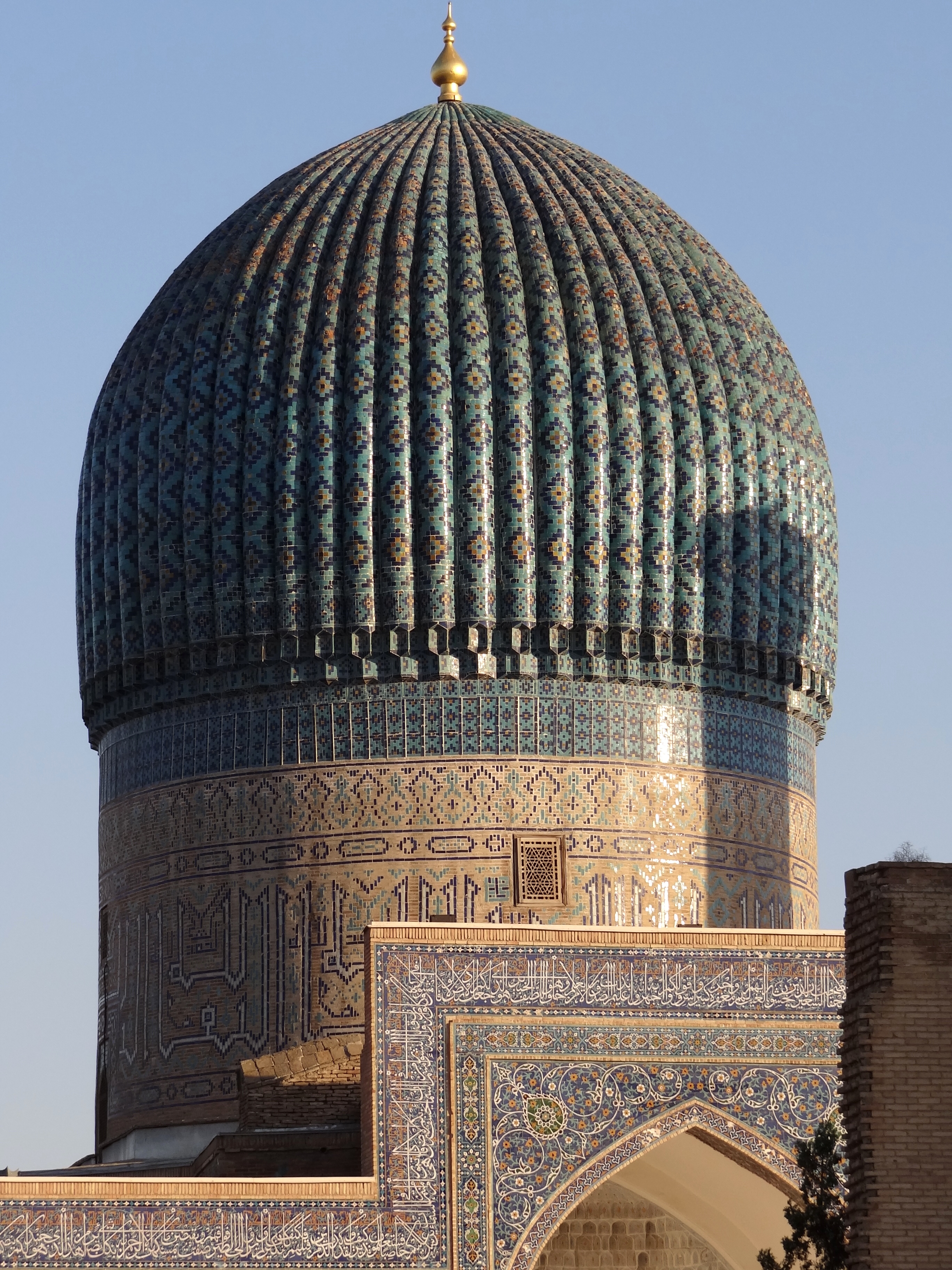
The dome of the Gur-i Amir Mausoleum in Samarqand

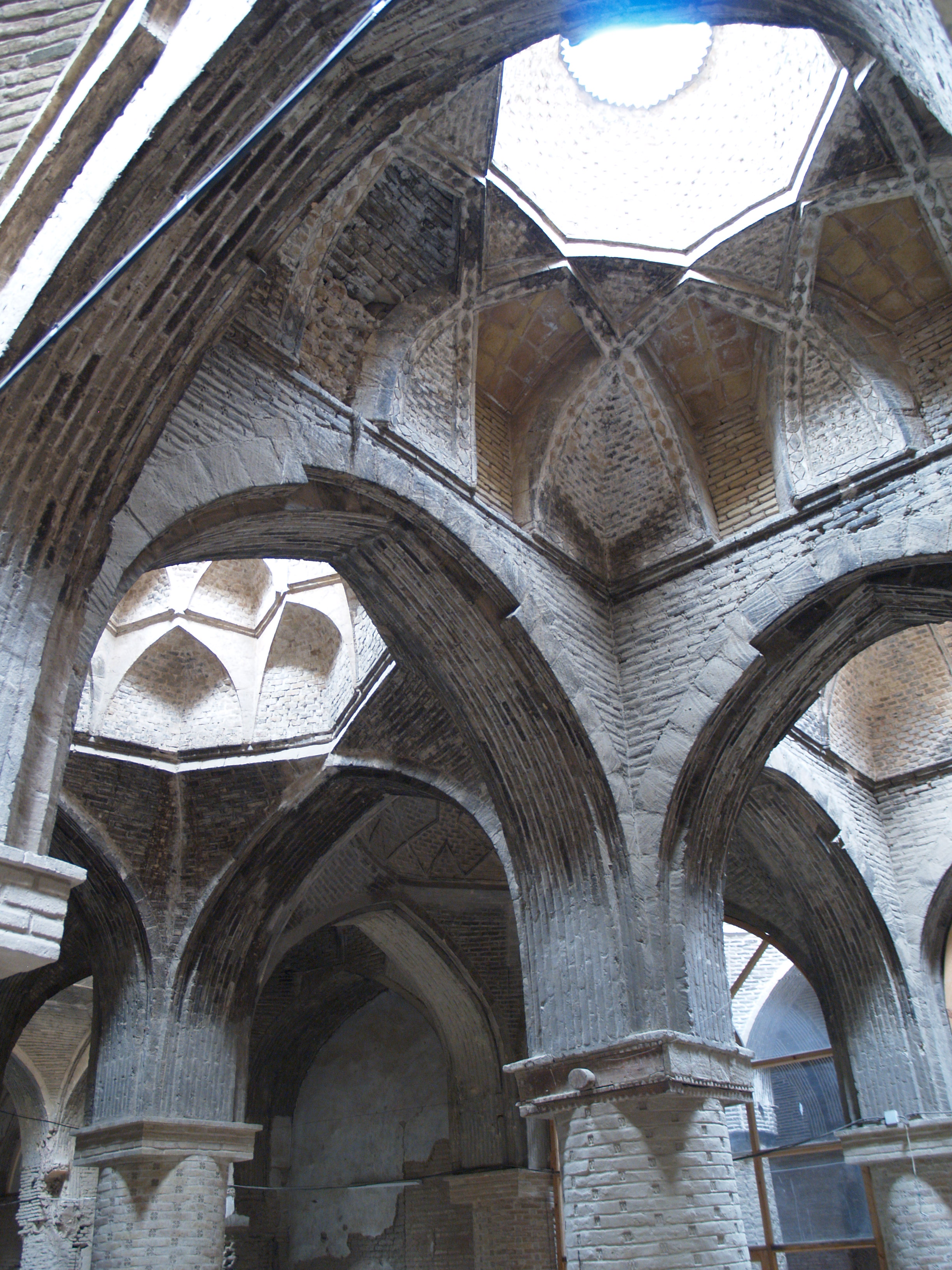
Non-radial rib vault in the Jameh Mosque of Isfahan

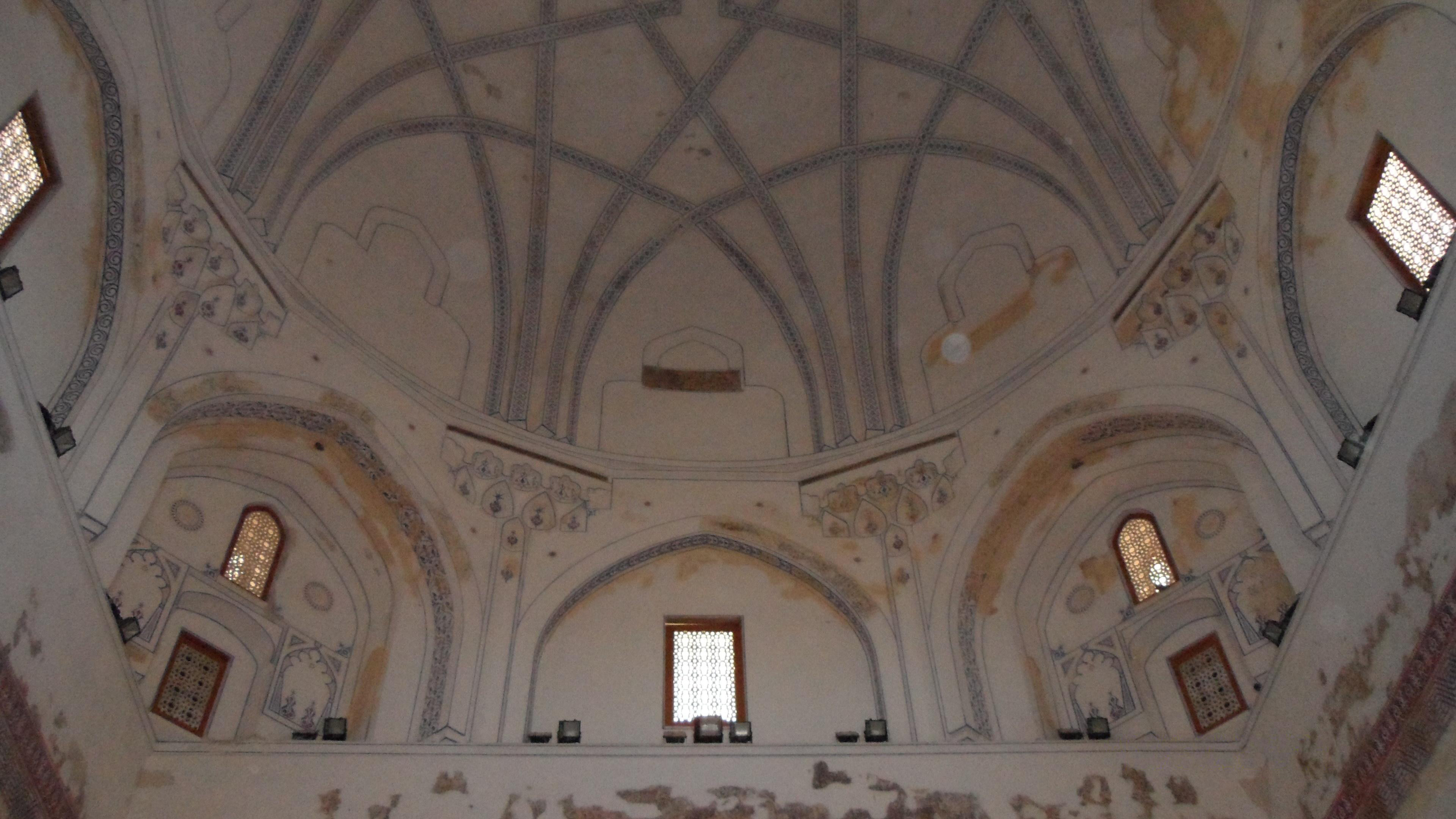
Dome of the tomb of Ahmed Sanjar in Merv

==== Domes in South Asia ====
The use of domes in South Asia started with the establishment of Delhi sultanate in 1204 CE. Unlike Ottoman domes, and even more so than Persian domes, domes in South Asia tend to be more bulbous. Many monumental Mughal domes were also double-shelled and derived from the Iranian tradition. The design of the Tomb of Humayun (completed around 1571–72), including its double-shelled dome, suggests that its architects were familiar with Timurid monuments in Samarqand. The central dome of the Taj Mahal likewise features a bulbous profile and a double-shelled construction.

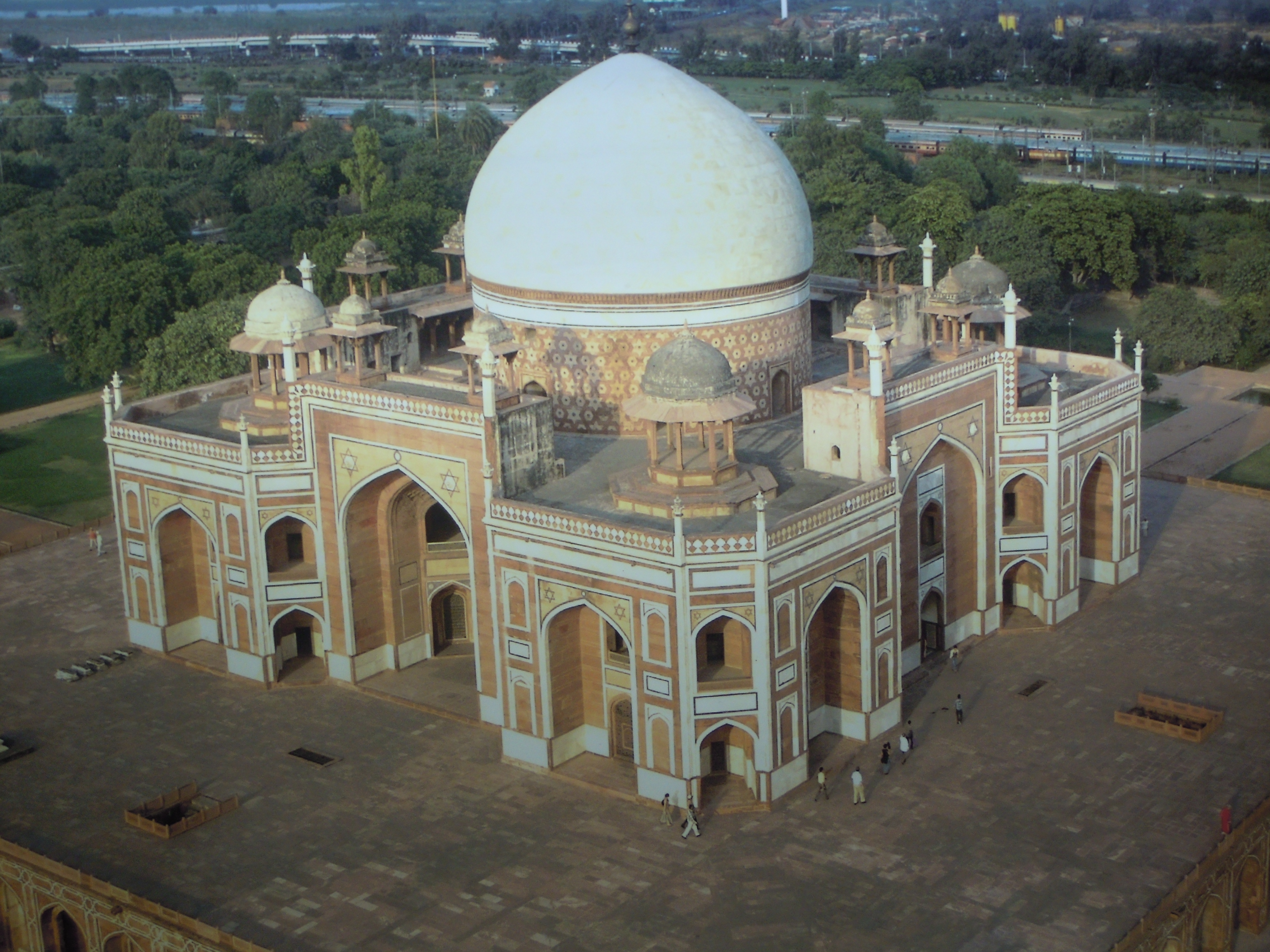
View of the main dome at Humayun's Tomb in Delhi

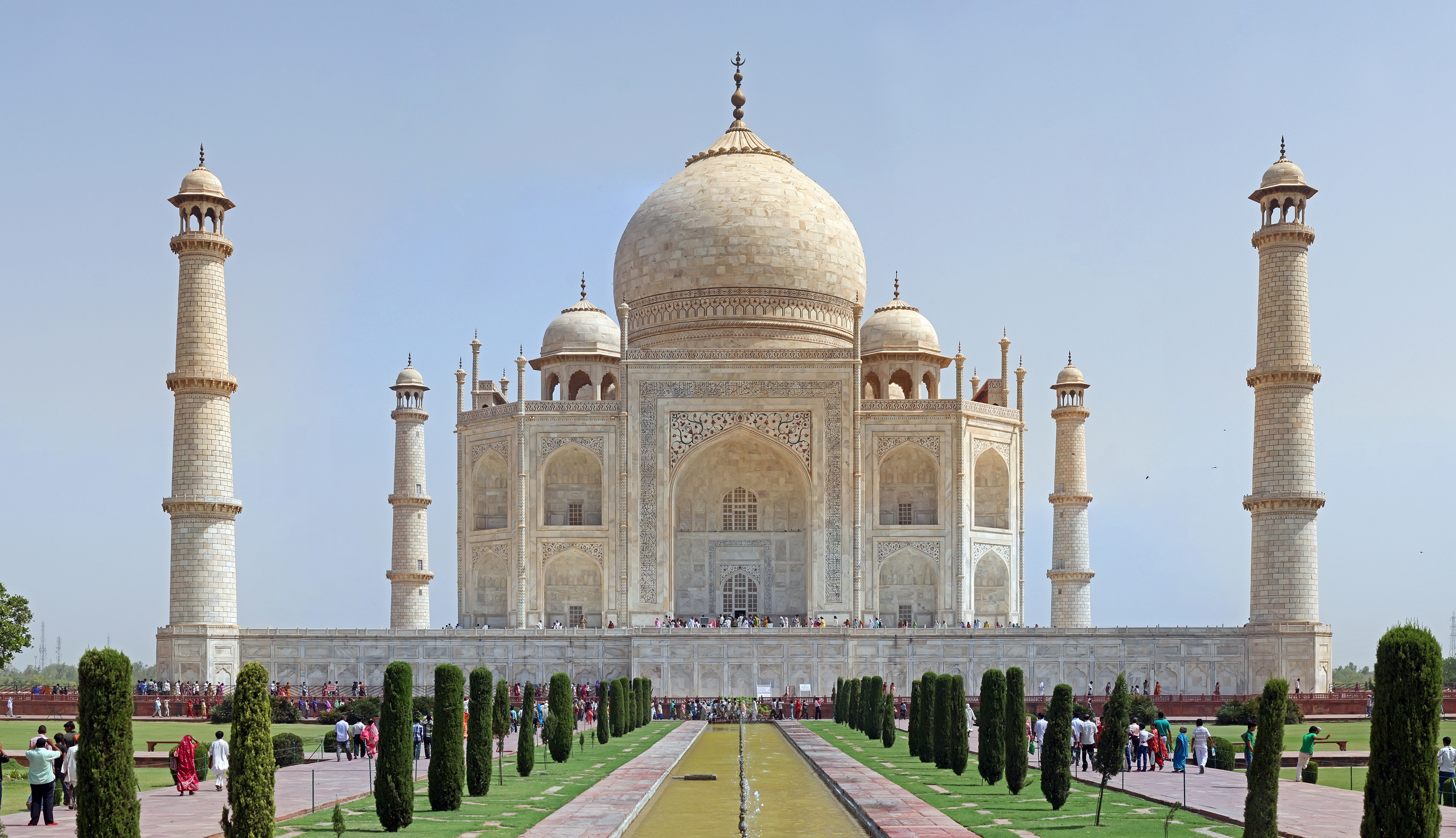
Dome of Taj Mahal in Agra

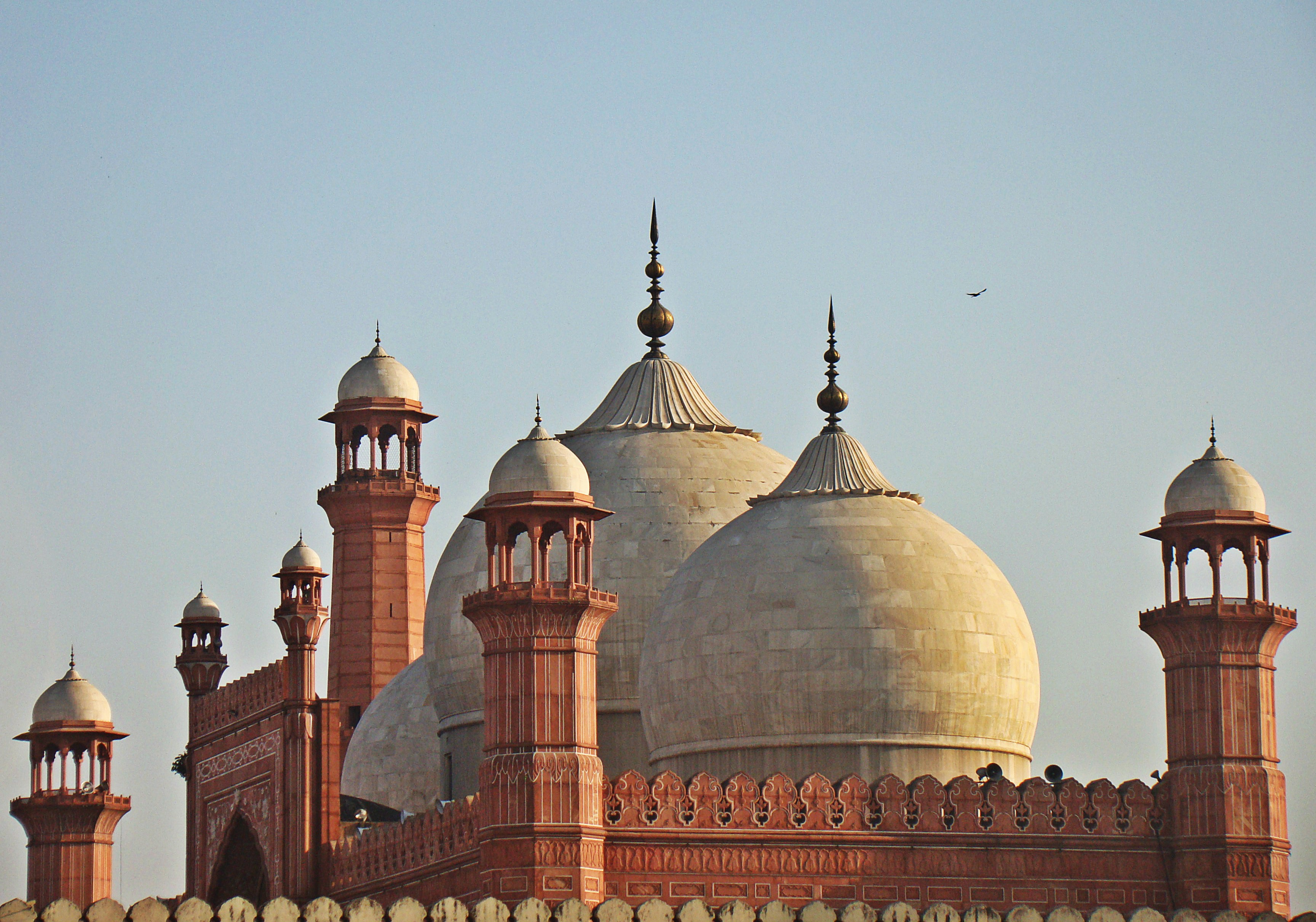
The bulbous domes of the Badshahi Mosque in Lahore

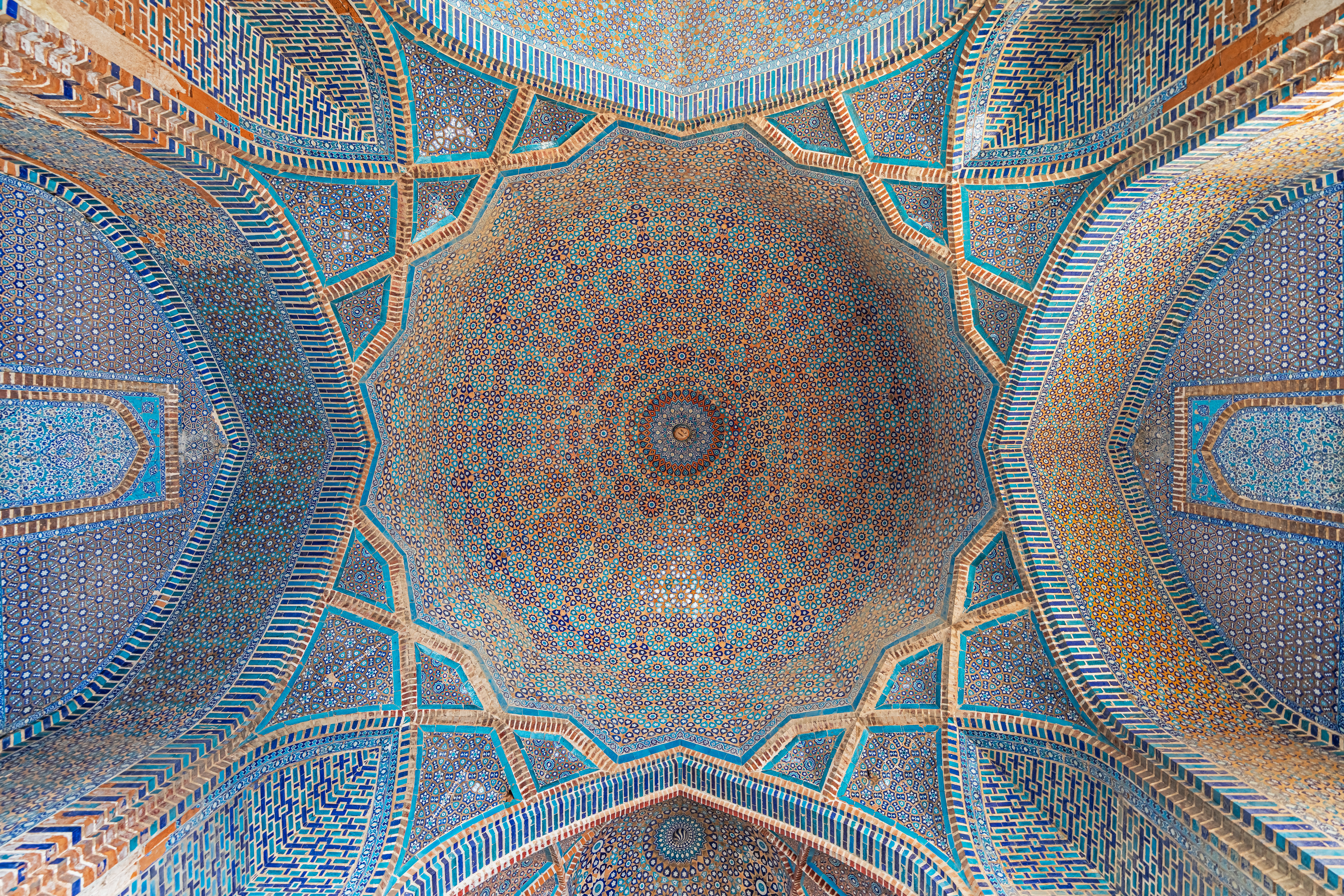
The main dome of Shah Jahan Mosque, Thatta has tiles arranged in a stellate pattern to represent the night sky

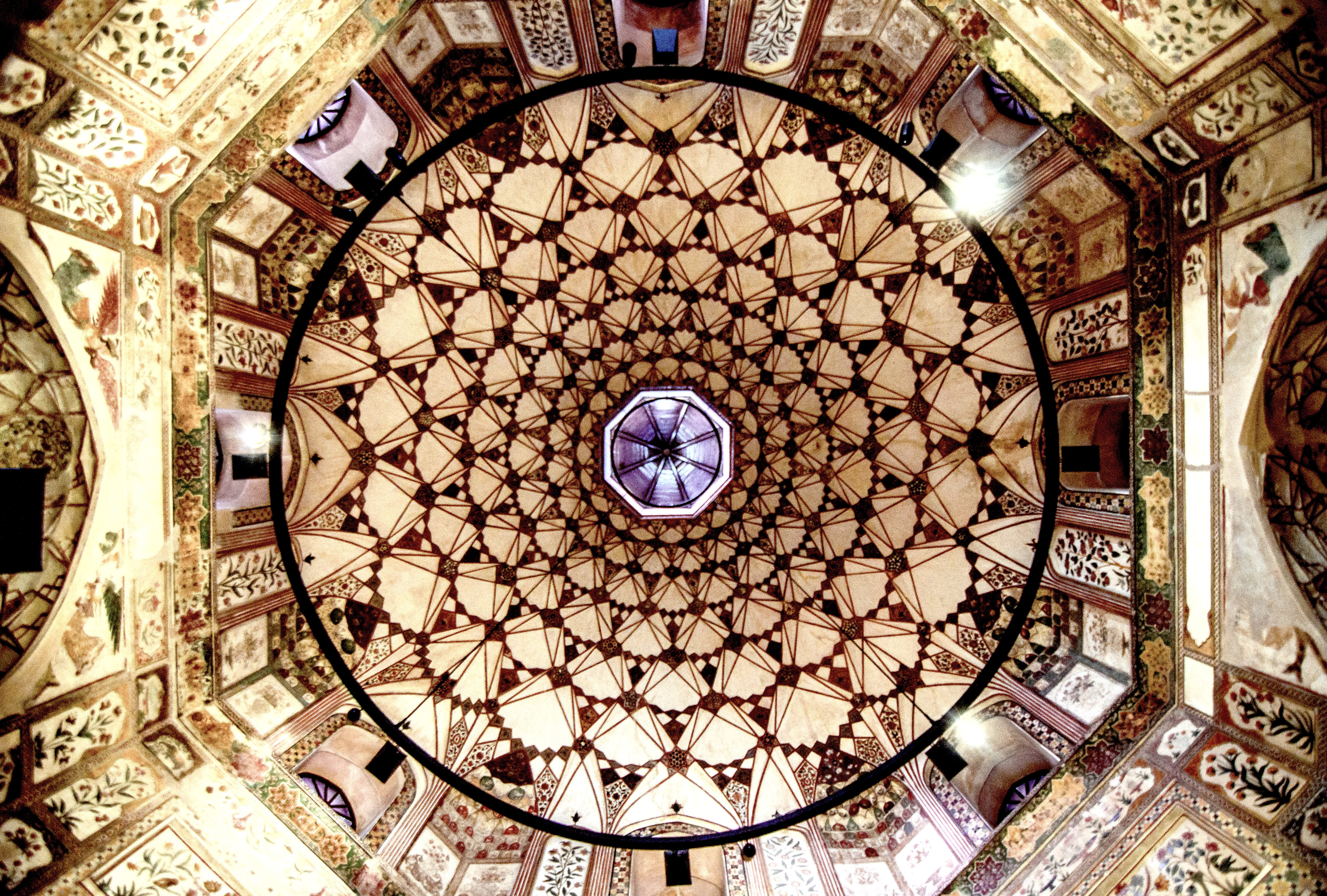
The interior of the main dome of Shahi Hammam in Lahore

==== Ribbed domes in Al-Andalus and the Maghreb ====
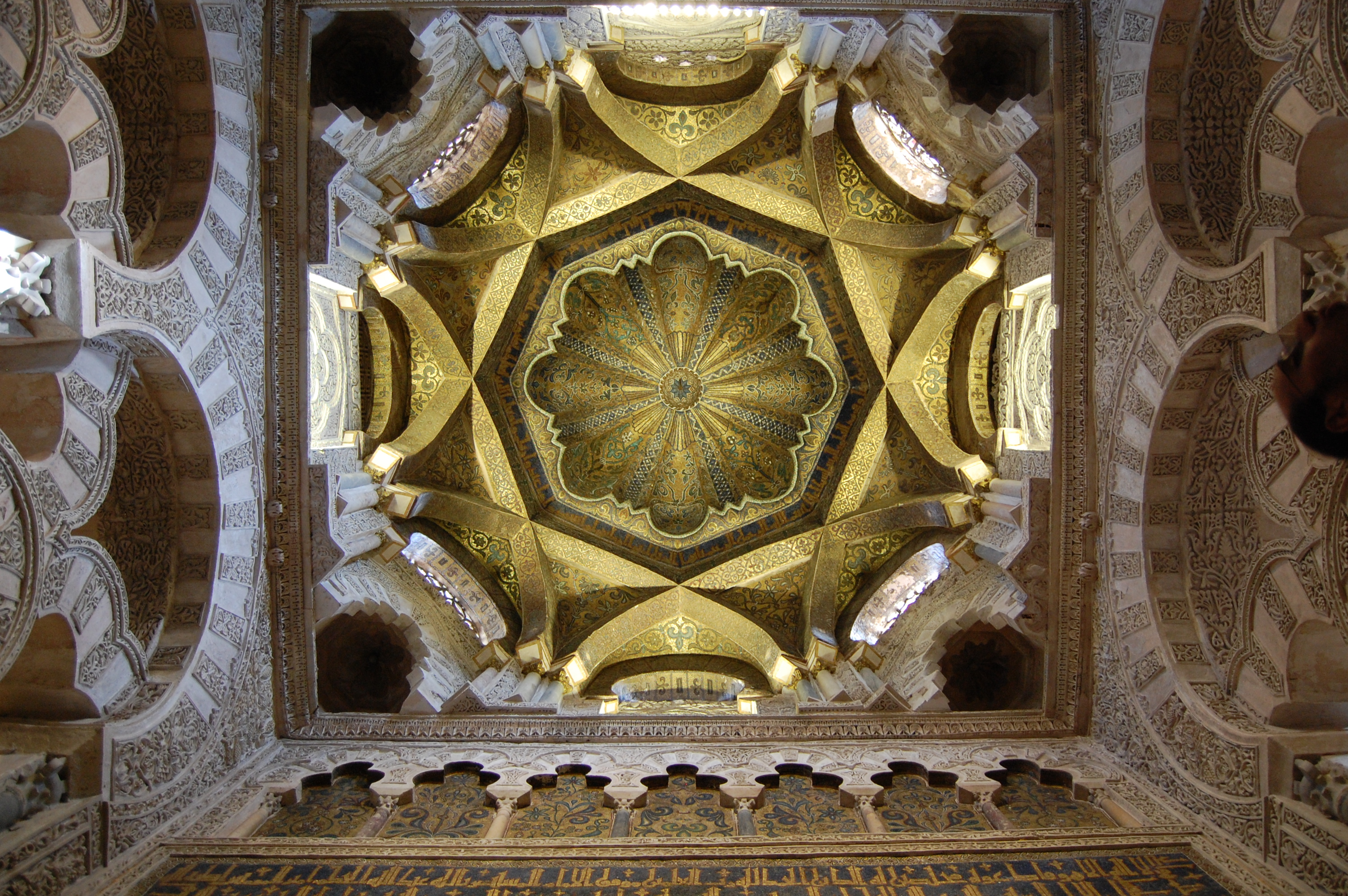
Ribbed dome in front of the mihrab in the Mosque–Cathedral of Córdoba, added in the 10th century

The Great Mosque of Córdoba in Al-Andalus was initially built with a system of double-arched arcades supporting the flat timberwork ceiling. The columns of the arcades are connected by horseshoe arches which support brick pillars, which are in turn interconnected by semicircular arches. This arcade system was copied during the mosque's subsequent expansions, but the expansion by al-Hakam II after 961 also introduced a series of ornate ribbed domes. Three domes span the vaults in front of the mihrab wall while another one covers an area now known by its Spanish name, the Capilla de Villaviciosa, located several bays before the mihrab. In sections which now supporting these domes, additional supporting structures were needed to bear the thrust of the cupolas. The architects solved this problem by the construction of intersecting arches. The domes themselves are built with eight intersecting stone ribs. Rather than meeting in the centre of the dome, the ribs intersect one another off-center, leaving the central space to be occupied by a smaller cupola. For the domes in front of the mihrab, the ribs form an eight-pointed star and an octagonal cupola in the centre. For the dome over the Capilla de Villaviciosa, the ribs leave a central square space between them, with an octagonal cupola added over this.

The ribbed domes of the Mosque-Cathedral of Córdoba served as models for later mosque buildings in the Islamic West of Al-Andalus and the Maghreb. At around 1000 AD, the Bab al-Mardum Mosque in Toledo was constructed with a similar, eight-ribbed dome, surrounded by eight other ribbed domes of varying design. Similar domes are also seen in the mosque building of the Aljafería of Zaragoza. The architectural form of the ribbed dome was further developed in the Maghreb: the central dome of the Great Mosque of Tlemcen, a masterpiece of the Almoravids founded in 1082, has twelve slender ribs and the shell between the ribs is filled with filigree stucco work.

==== Ottoman domes ====
The Selimiye Mosque (1568–74) in Edirne represents the pinnacle of Ottoman domed architecture. Its massive dome is supported by eight pillars in an octagonal configuration.

Ottoman architecture developed a specific form of monumental, representative building: large central domes were erected on top of a centrally planned building. After the Ottomans conquered Constantinople in 1453, they found a variety of Byzantine Christian churches, the largest and most prominent being the Hagia Sophia. The brickwork-and-mortar ribs and the spherical shell of the central dome of the Hagia Sophia were built simultaneously, as a self-supporting structure without any wooden centring. In the early Byzantine church of Hagia Irene, the ribs of the dome vault are fully integrated into the shell, similar to Western Roman domes, and thus are not visible from within the building. In the dome of the Hagia Sophia, the ribs and shell of the dome unite in a central medallion at the apex of the dome, the upper ends of the ribs being integrated into the shell; shell and ribs form one single structural entity. The structural transition below the dome is achieved by four pendentives and the domed space is extended by two semi-domes. This design, along with early Ottoman designs, served as the model for subsequent development.

Ottoman architect Mimar Sinan attempted to solve the structural issues of the Hagia Sophia dome by constructing a system of centrally symmetric pillars with flanking semi-domes, as exemplified by the design of the Süleymaniye Mosque (four pillars with two flanking shield walls and two semi-domes, 1550–1557) and the Selimiye Mosque in Edirne (eight pillars with four diagonal semi-domes, 1568–1574). The design of the Selimiye Mosque, which came after many spatial and structural experiments in previous works, is Sinan's masterpiece and the pinnacle of Ottoman domed architecture. It optimizes the domed space, making all elements of the building subordinate to it. Ottoman sources boasted that its dome surpassed that of the Hagia Sophia for the first time.

Schematic drawing of a pendentive dome

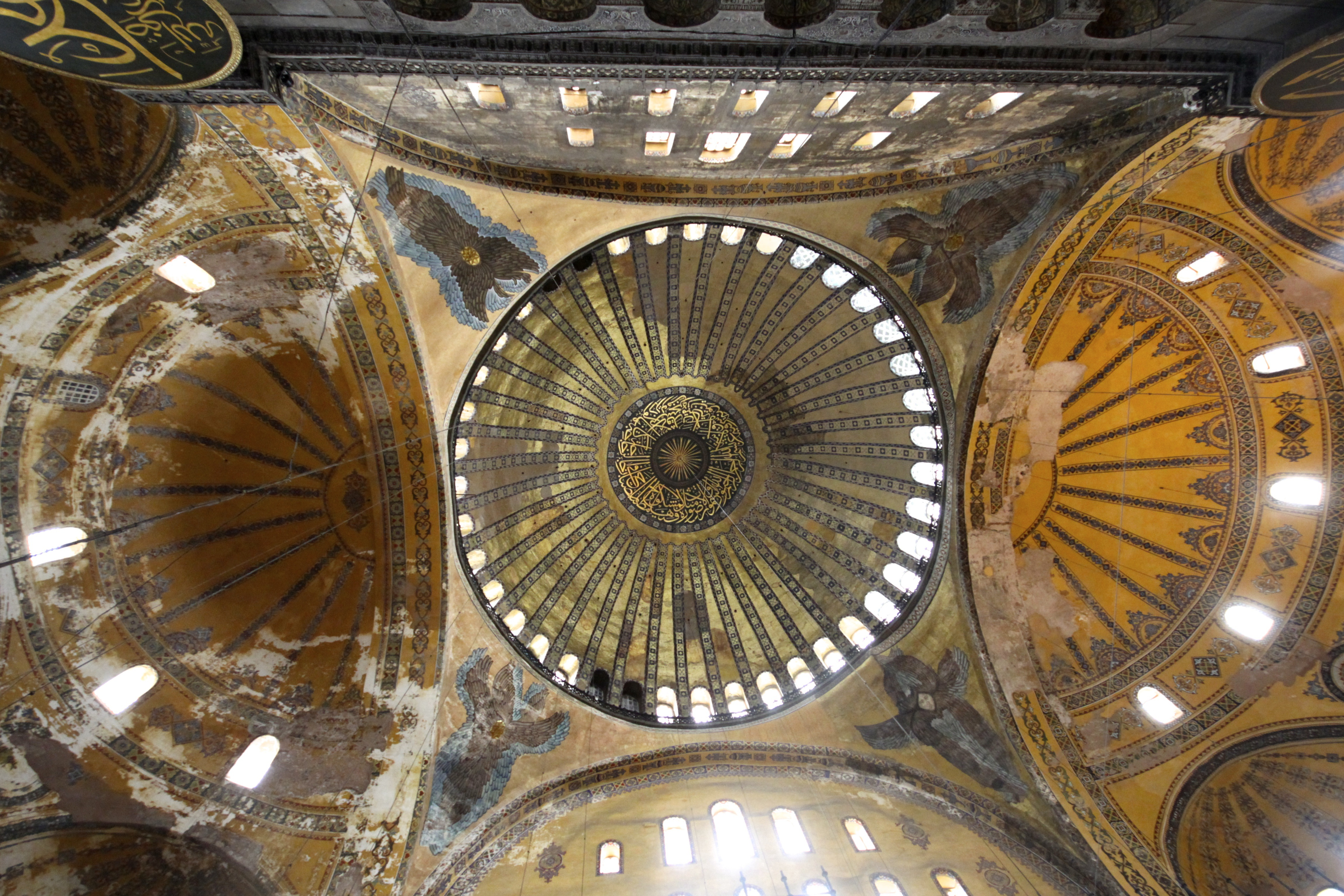
Central dome and semi-domes of the Hagia Sophia (6th century - pre-Islamic)

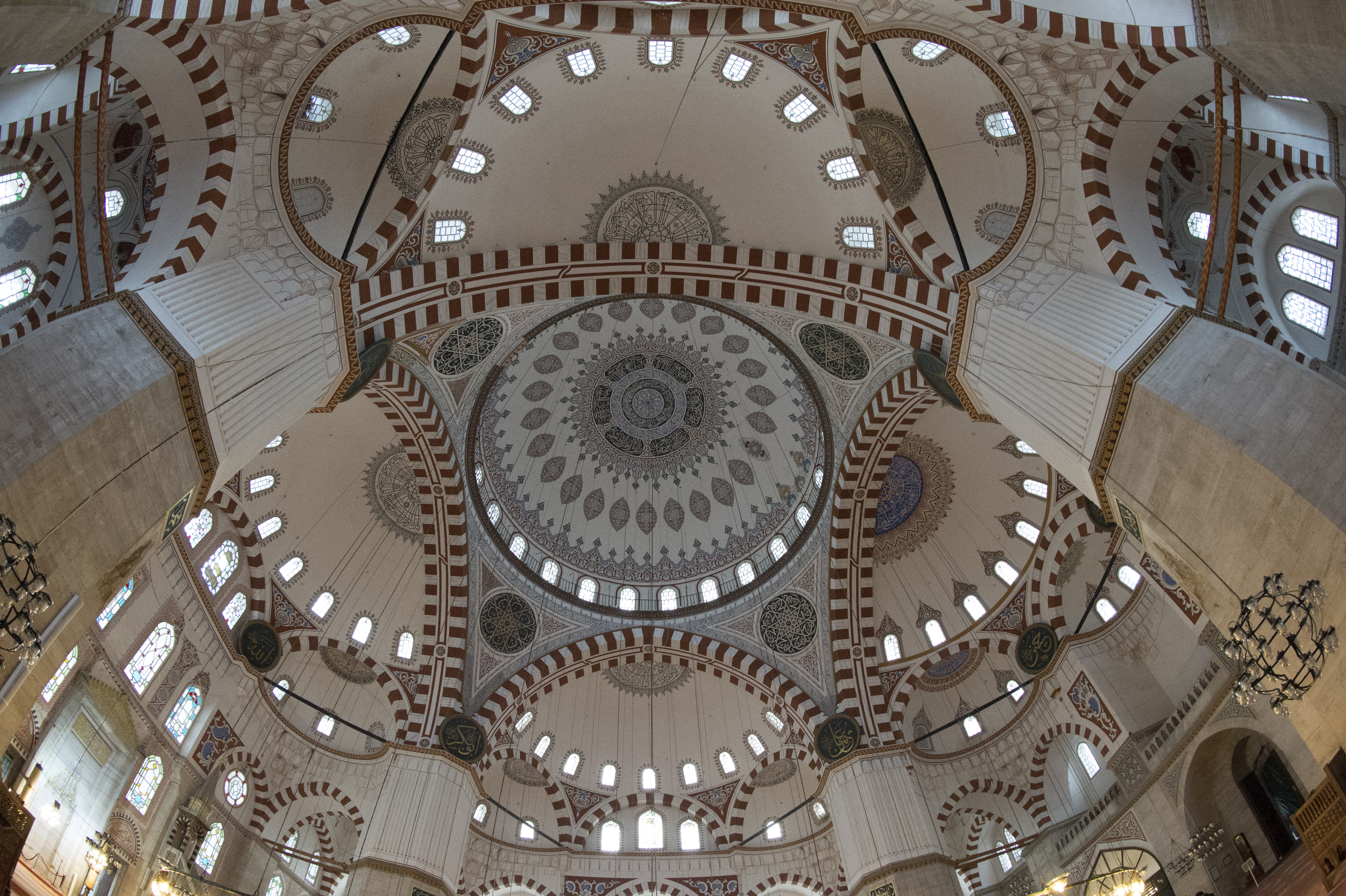
The Şehzade Mosque (1543–8) combines a central dome supported by four pillars and four semi-domes.

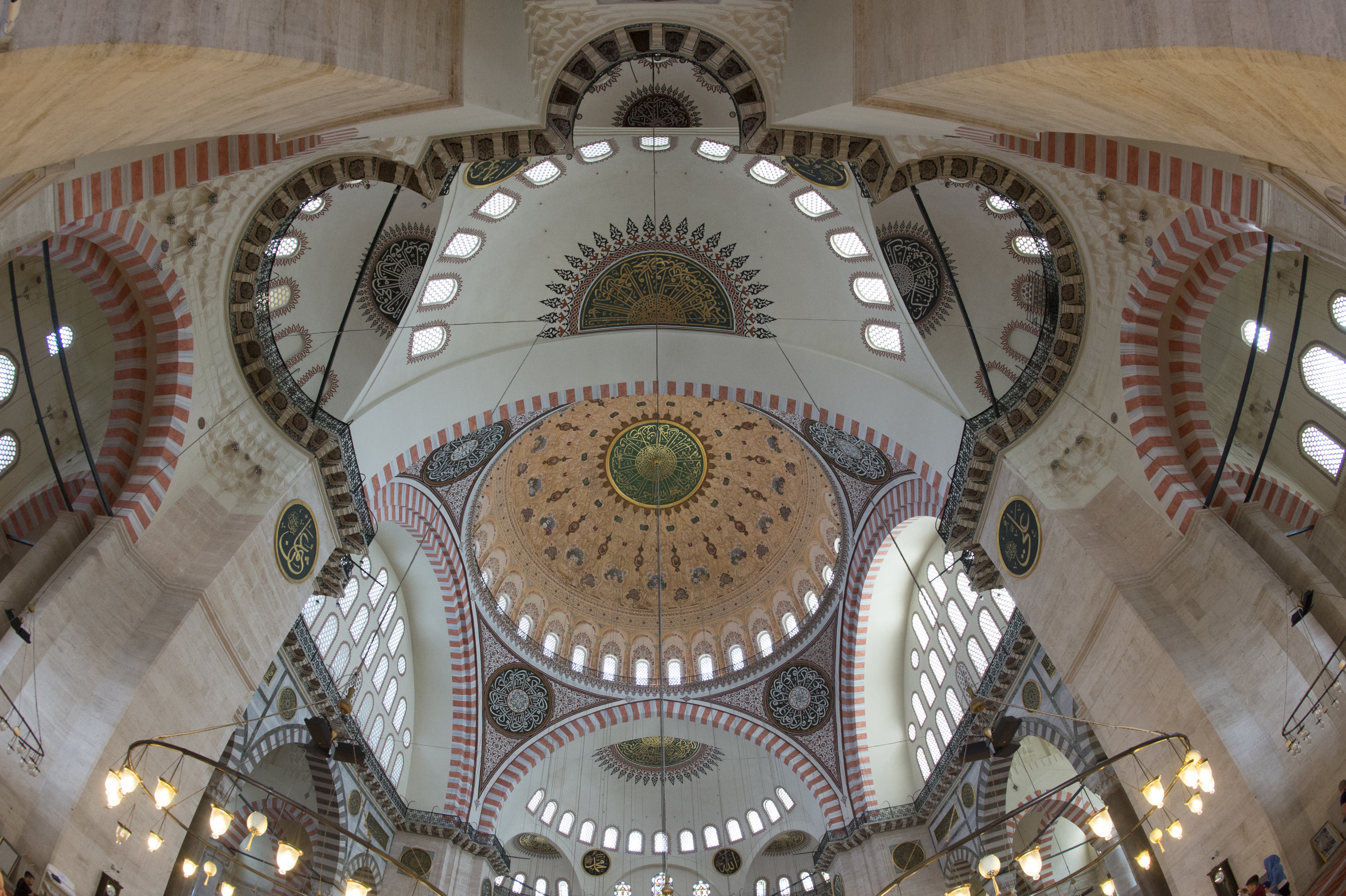
The Süleymaniye Mosque (1550–7), evokes the Hagia Sophia's design with a central dome and two semi-domes.

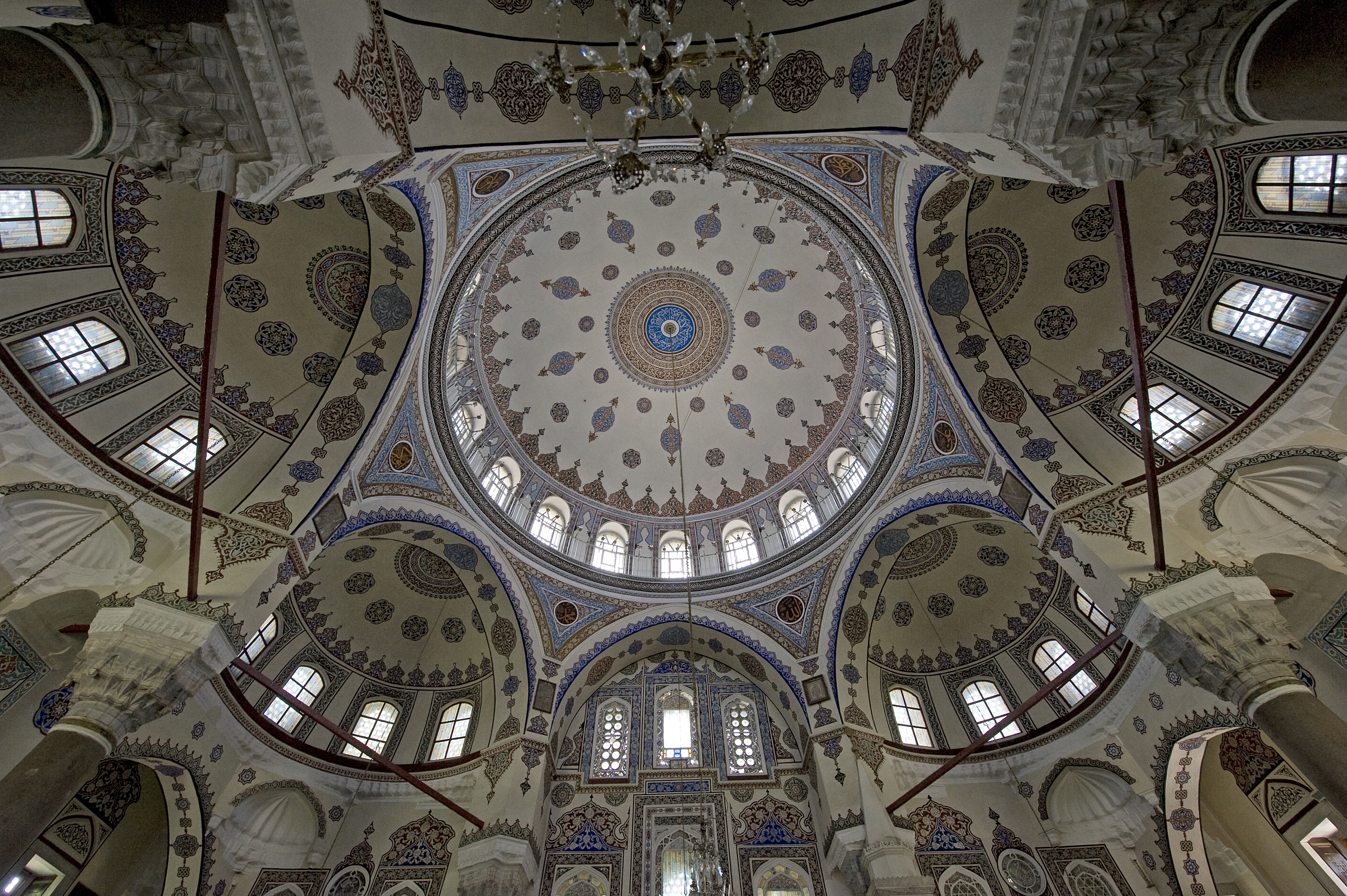
The Kara Ahmed Pasha Mosque (1554) uses an hexagonal support system for the main dome.

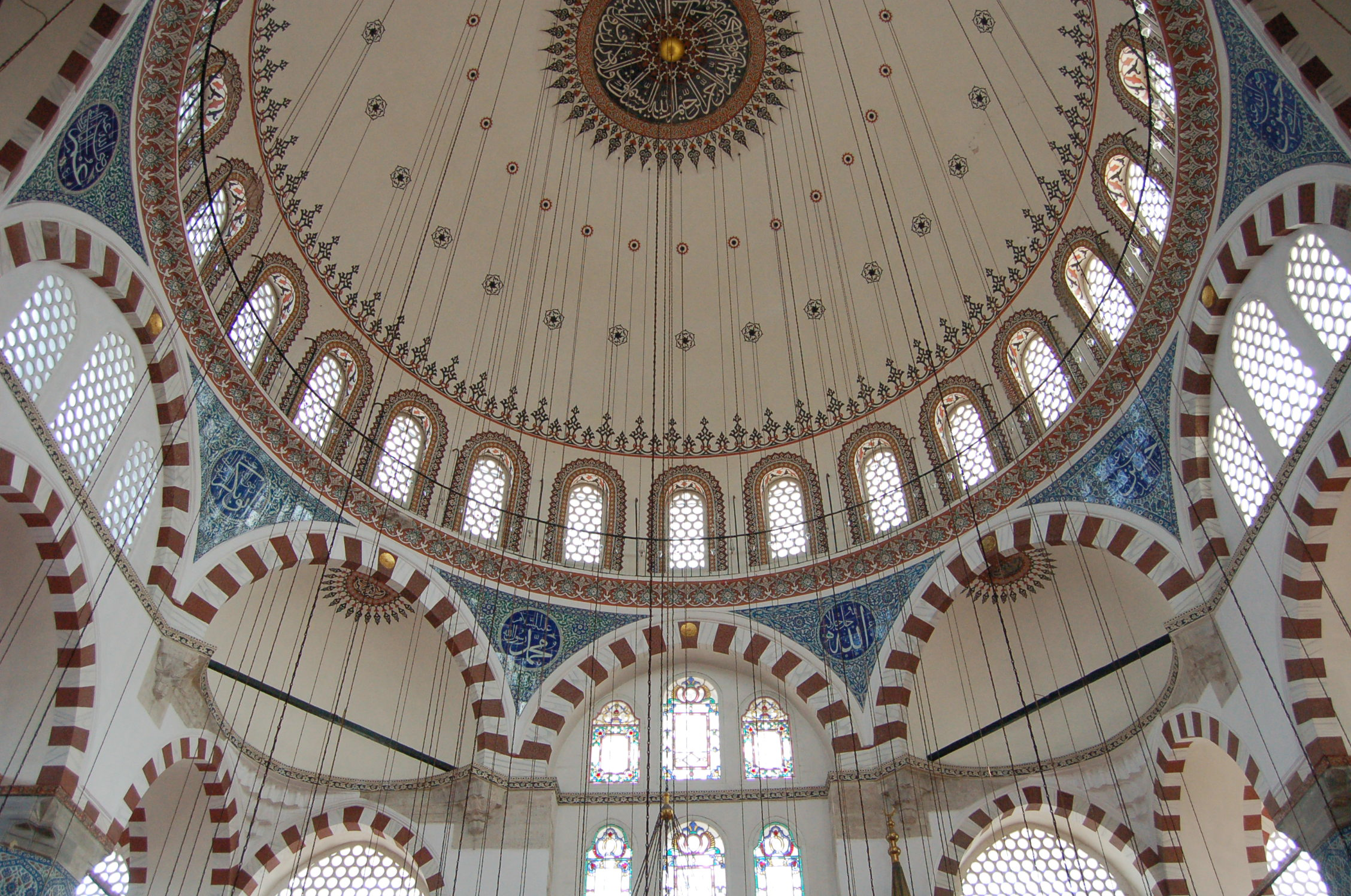
The small Rüstem Pasha Mosque (1561) is an early example of Sinan's use of an octagonal support system.

=== Gardens ===
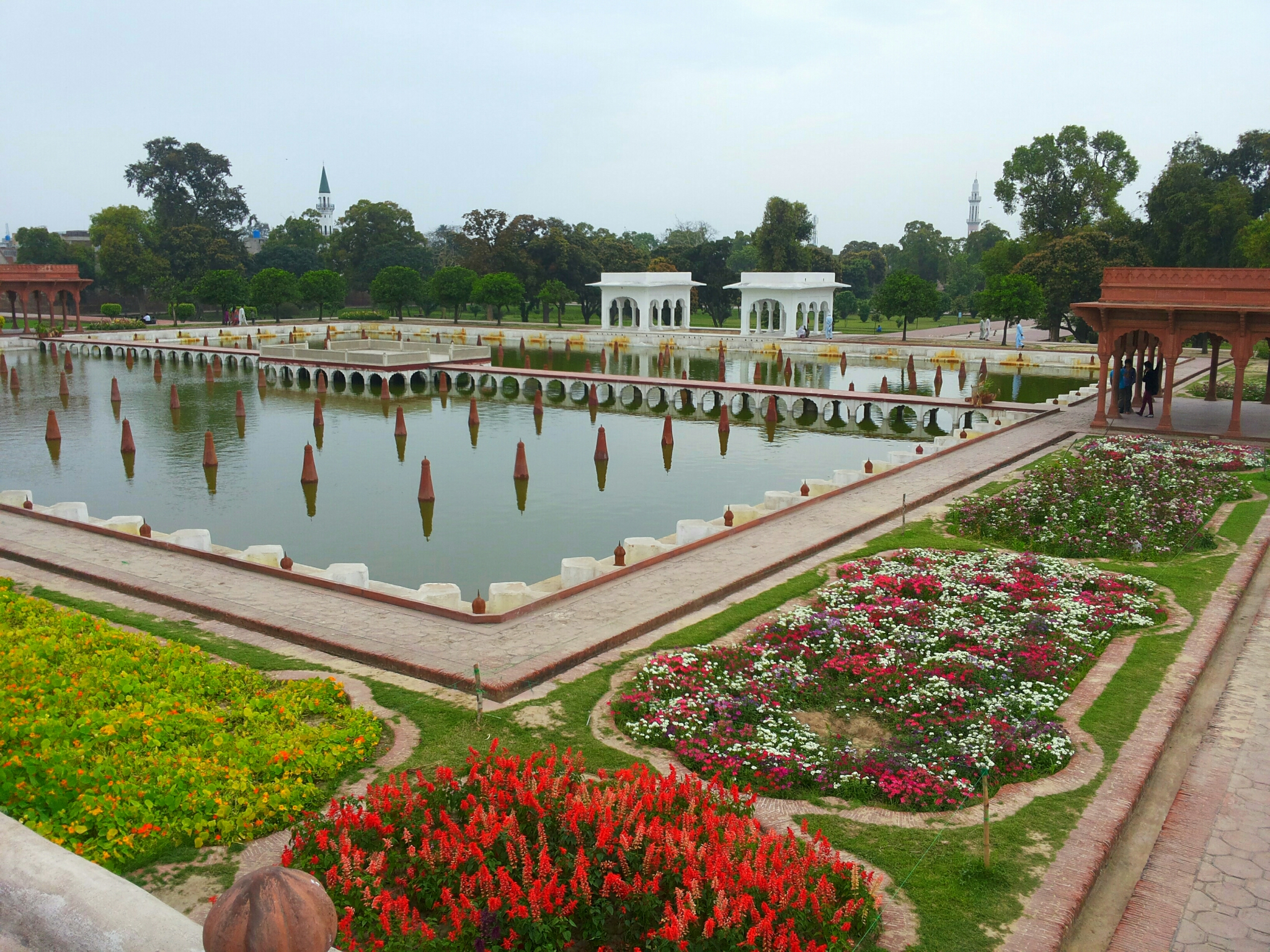
Shalamar Gardens, a Mughal paradise garden in Lahore, Pakistan

Gardens and water have for many centuries played an essential role in Islamic culture, and are often compared to the garden of Paradise. The comparison originates from the Achaemenid Empire. In his dialogue "Oeconomicus", Xenophon has Socrates relate the story of the Spartan general Lysander's visit to the Persian prince Cyrus the Younger, who shows the Greek his "Paradise at Sardis". The classical form of the Persian Paradise garden, or the charbagh, comprises a rectangular irrigated space with elevated pathways, which divide the garden into four sections of equal size:

One of the hallmarks of Persian gardens is the four-part garden laid out with axial paths that intersect at the garden's centre. This highly structured geometrical scheme, called the chahar bagh, became a powerful metaphor for the organization and domestication of the landscape, itself a symbol of political territory.

A Charbagh from Achaemenid time has been identified in the archaeological excavations at Pasargadae. The gardens of Chehel Sotoun (Isfahan), Fin Garden (Kashan), Eram Garden (Shiraz), Shazdeh Garden (Mahan), Dowlatabad Garden (Yazd), Abbasabad Garden (Abbasabad), Akbarieh Garden (South Khorasan Province), Pahlevanpour Garden, all in Iran, form part of the UNESCO World Heritage. Large Paradise gardens are also found at the Taj Mahal (Agra), and at Humayun's Tomb (Delhi), in India; the Shalimar Gardens (Lahore, Pakistan) or at the Alhambra and Generalife in Granada, Spain.

=== Ornamentation ===
As a common feature, Islamic architecture makes use of specific ornamental forms, including mathematically complicated, elaborate geometric patterns, floral motifs like the arabesque, and elaborate calligraphic inscriptions. The geometric or floral, interlaced forms, taken together, constitute an infinitely repeated pattern that extends beyond the visible material world. Figural motifs, such as animals, humans, and imaginary creatures, have a rich tradition in Islamic art, though they are generally more stylized than naturalistic. However, because of the religious taboo on figural representations, non-figural decoration remained more dominant overall and figural motifs were generally excluded from religious buildings entirely.

The importance of the written word in Islam ensured that epigraphic or calligraphic decoration played a prominent role in architecture. Epigraphic decoration can also indicate further political or religious messages through the selection of a textual program of inscriptions. For example, the calligraphic inscriptions adorning the Dome of the Rock include quotations from the Qur'an that reference the miracle of Jesus and his human nature (e.g. Quran 19:33–35), the oneness of God (e.g. Qur'an 112), and the role of Muhammad as the "Seal of the Prophets", which have been interpreted as an attempt to announce the rejection of the Christian concept of the Holy Trinity and to proclaim the triumph of Islam over Christianity and Judaism. Additionally, foundation inscriptions on buildings commonly indicate its founder or patron, the date of its construction, the name of the reigning sovereign, and other information.

These decorative motifs are expressed in a range of mediums, including stone carving, brickwork, carved stucco, tilework, paint, glass mosaics, marble or stone paneling, and stained glass windows. Capitals, the upper part or crowning feature of a column, serve as a transition piece and are often decoratively carved. They range greatly in design and shape in Islamic architecture. Early Islamic buildings in Iran featured "Persian" type capitals which included designs of bulls heads, while Mediterranean structures displayed a more classical influence.

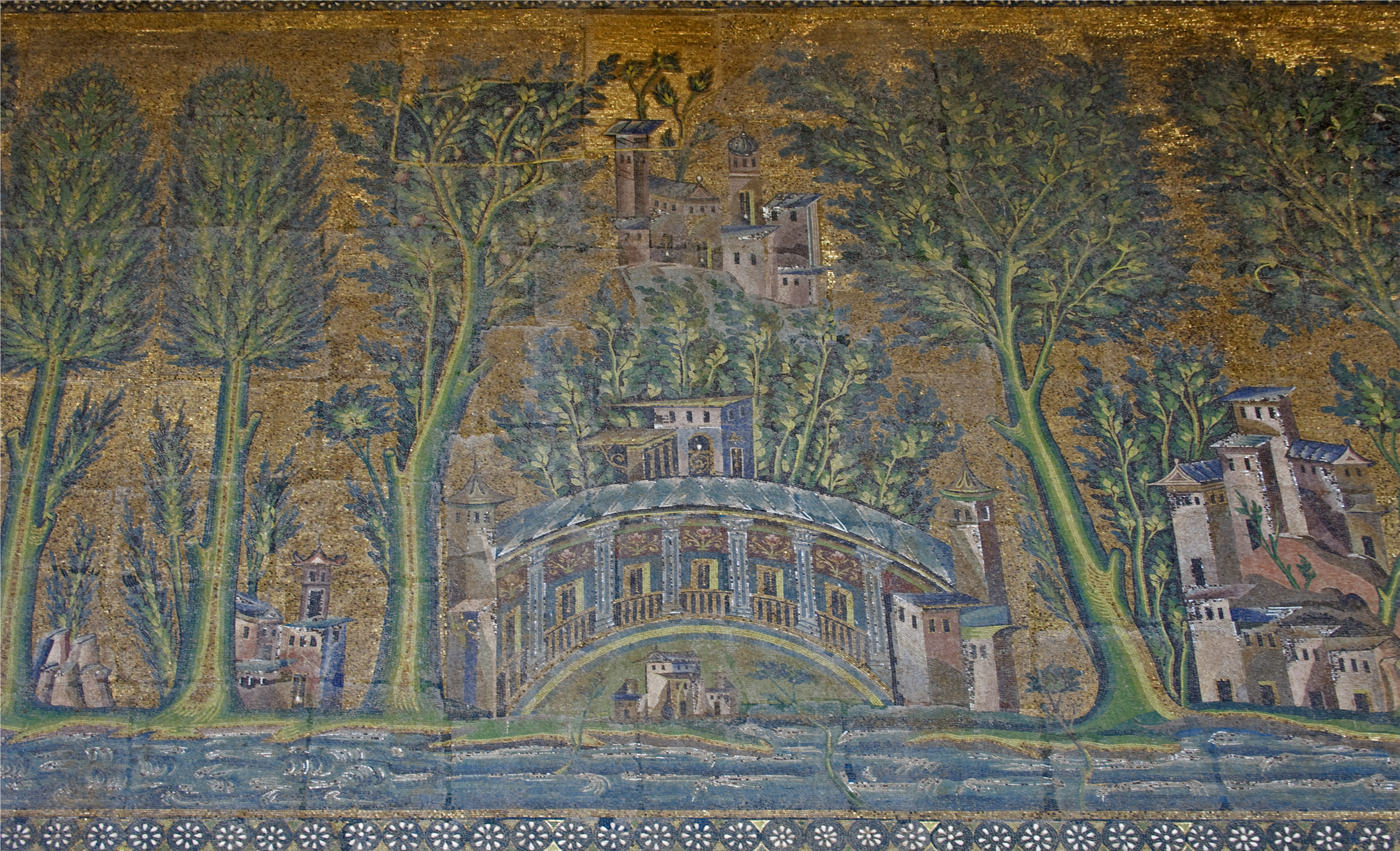
Wall mosaics in the Umayyad Mosque of Damascus (8th century, Umayyad period)

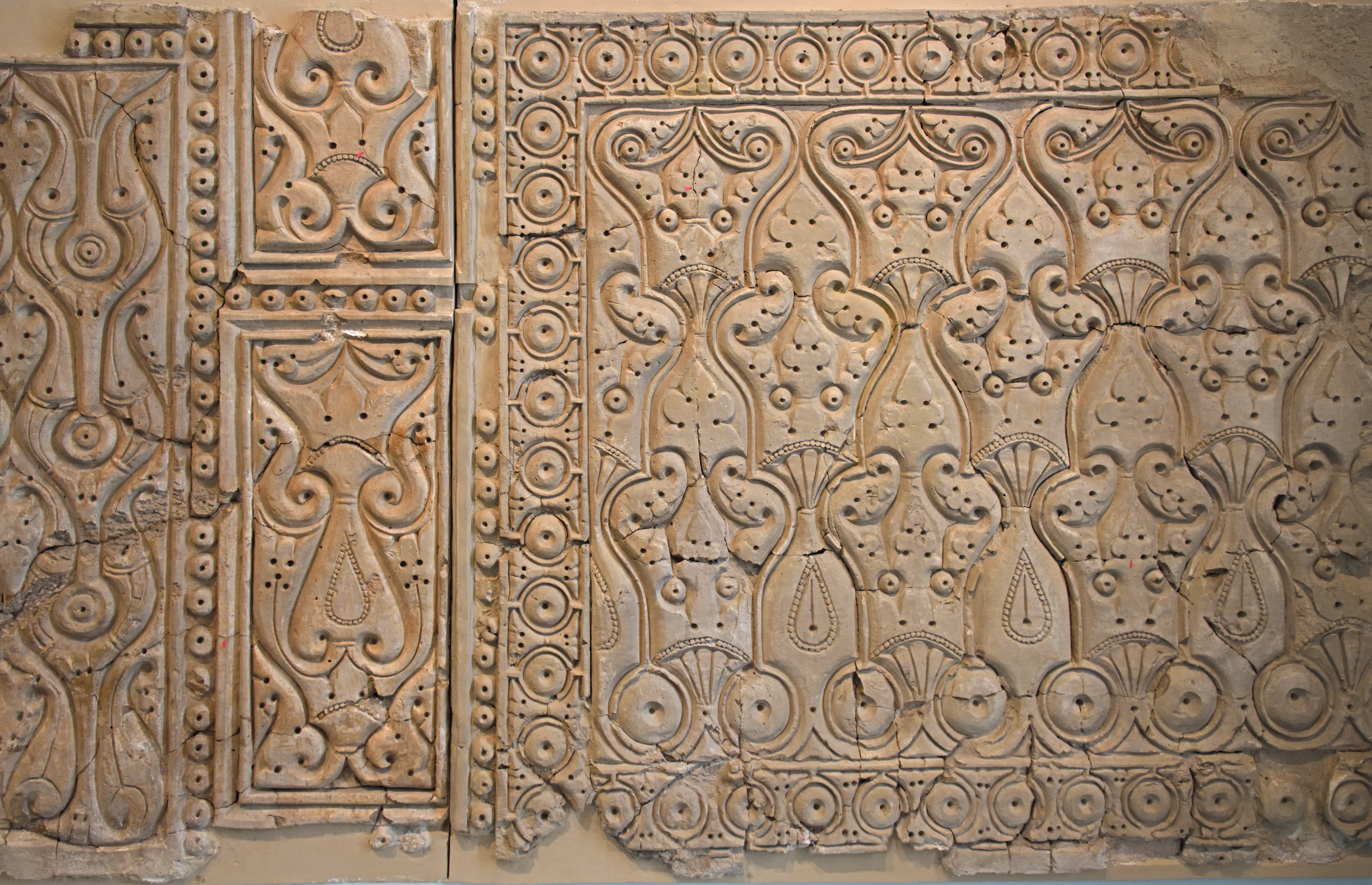
Panel of stucco decoration exemplifying the "beveled" style that employed abstract motifs in Abbasid Samarra (9th century, Abbasid period).

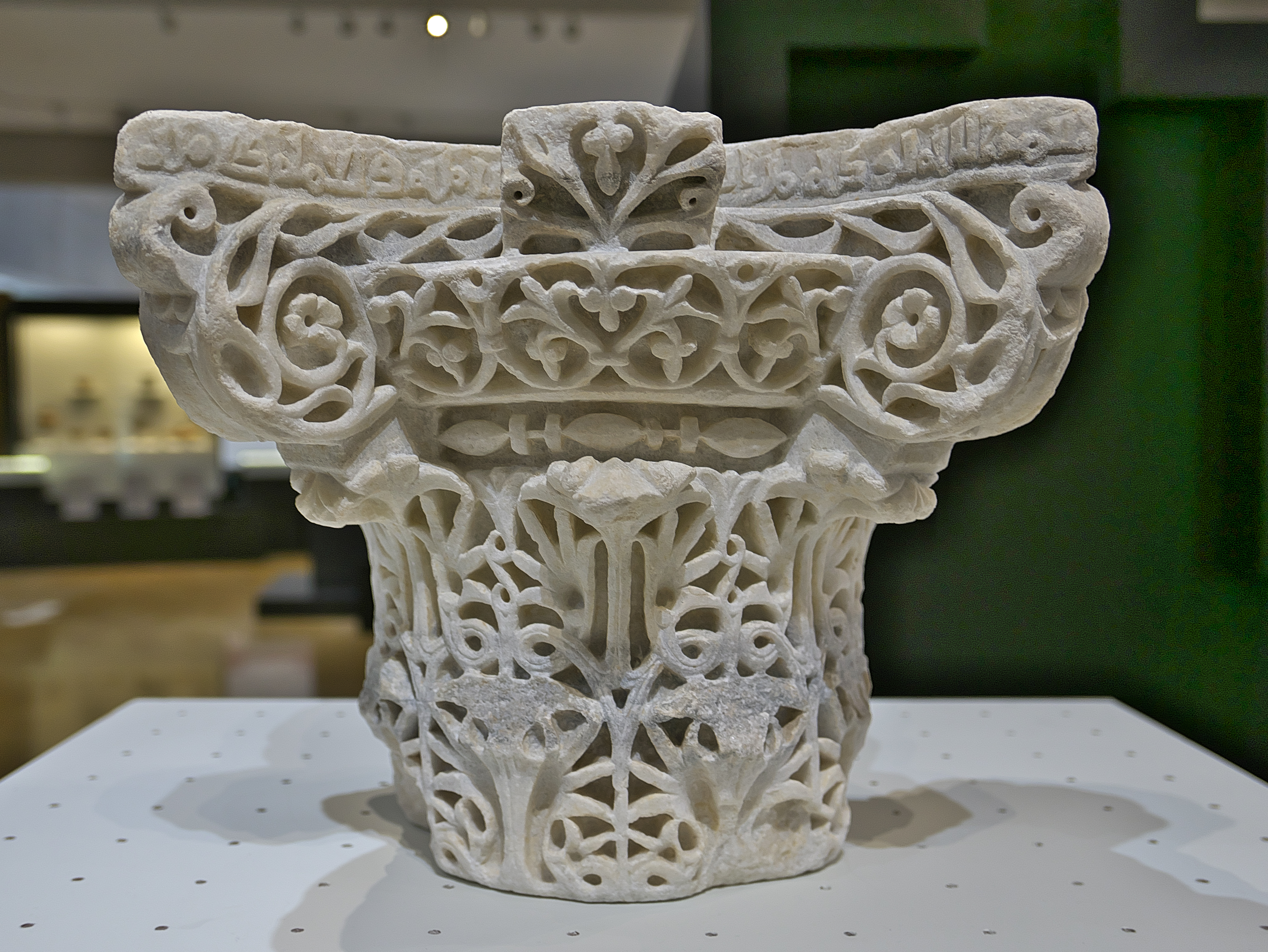
Carved marble capital from Córdoba (10th century, Andalusi Umayyad period)

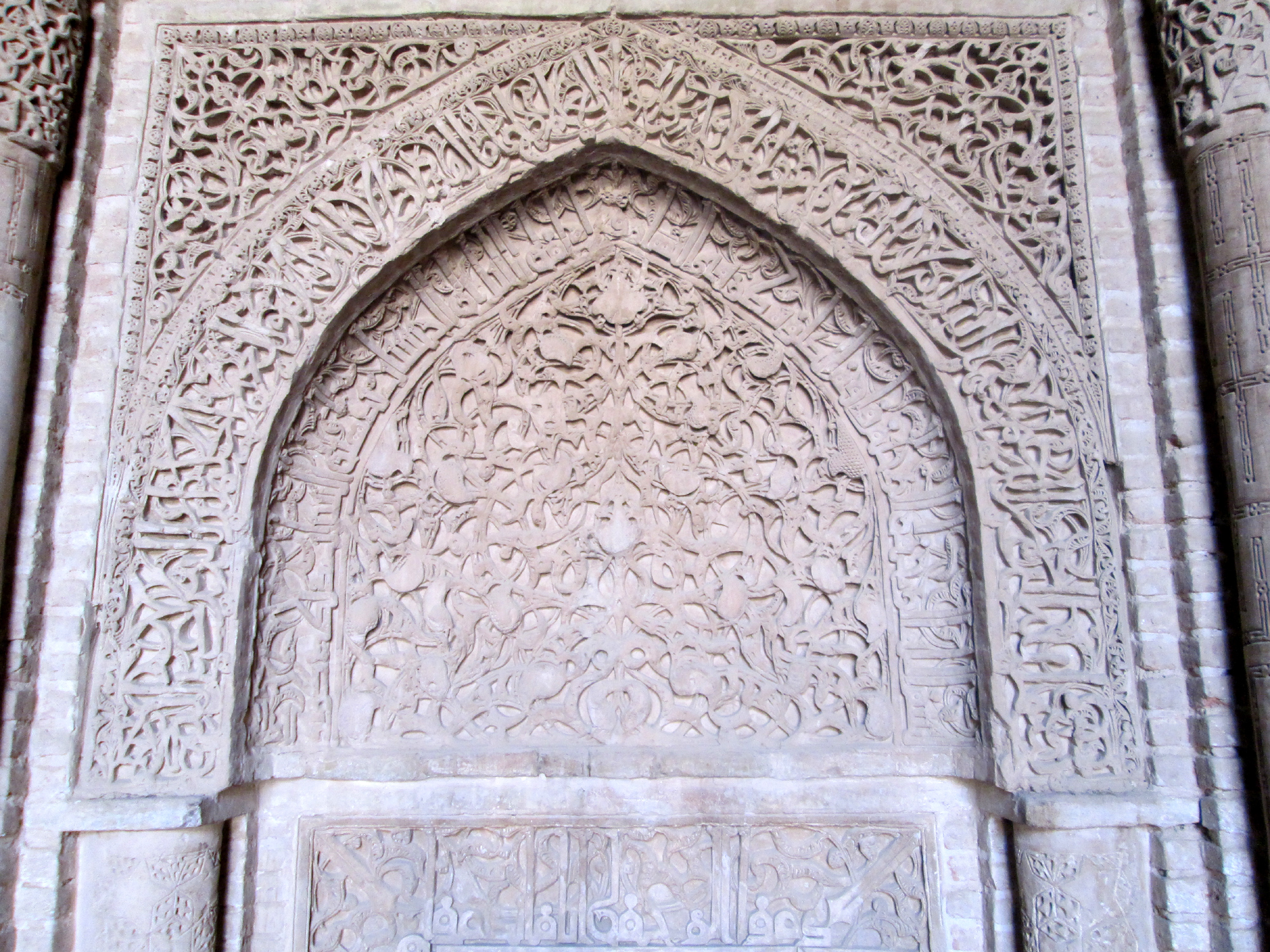
Vegetal arabesques and inscriptions carved in stucco in the Friday Mosque of Ardestan (11th century, Seljuk period)

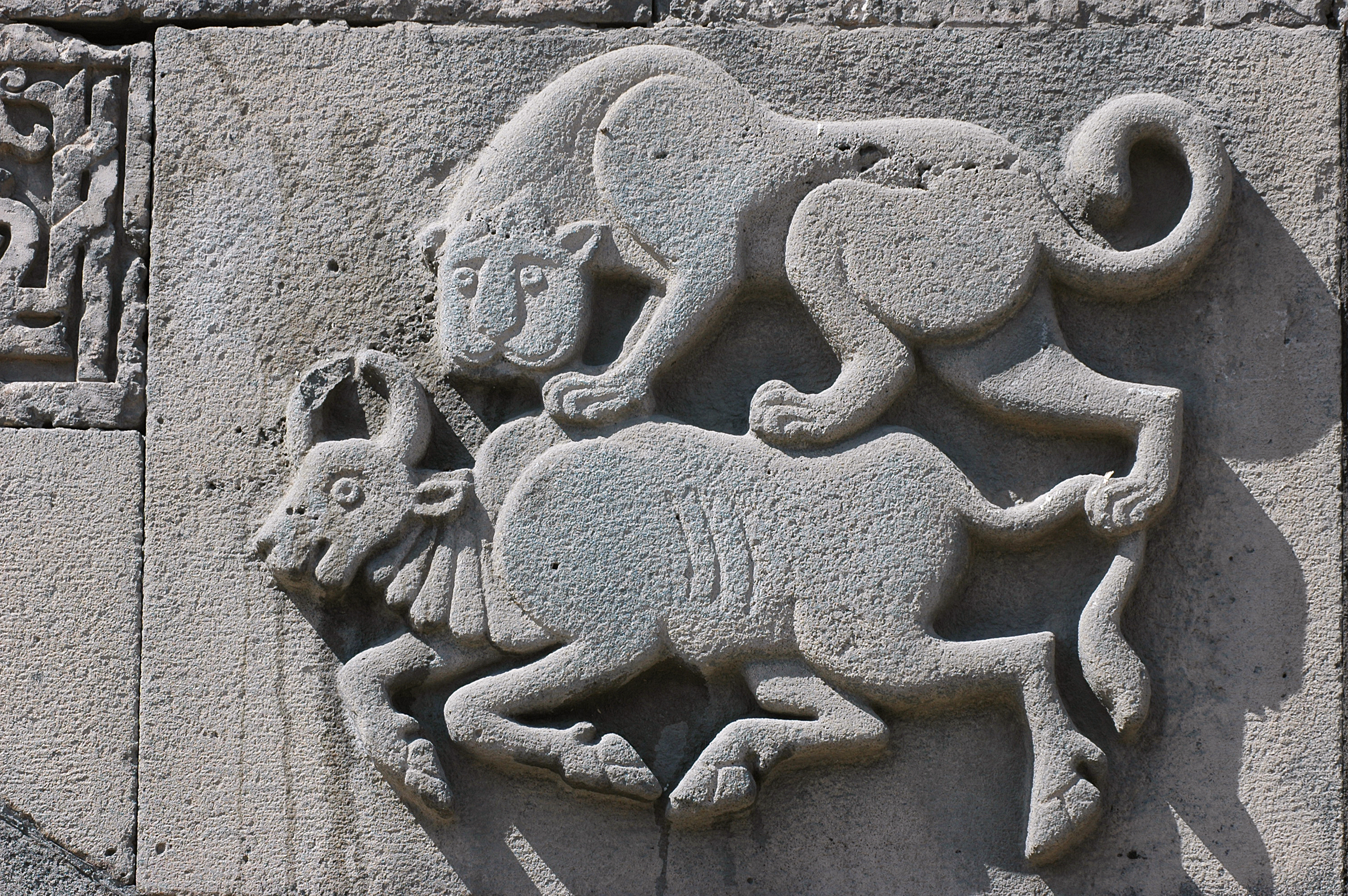
Figural imagery of lion and bull in carved stone at the Great Mosque of Diyarbakir (12th century, Artuqid period)

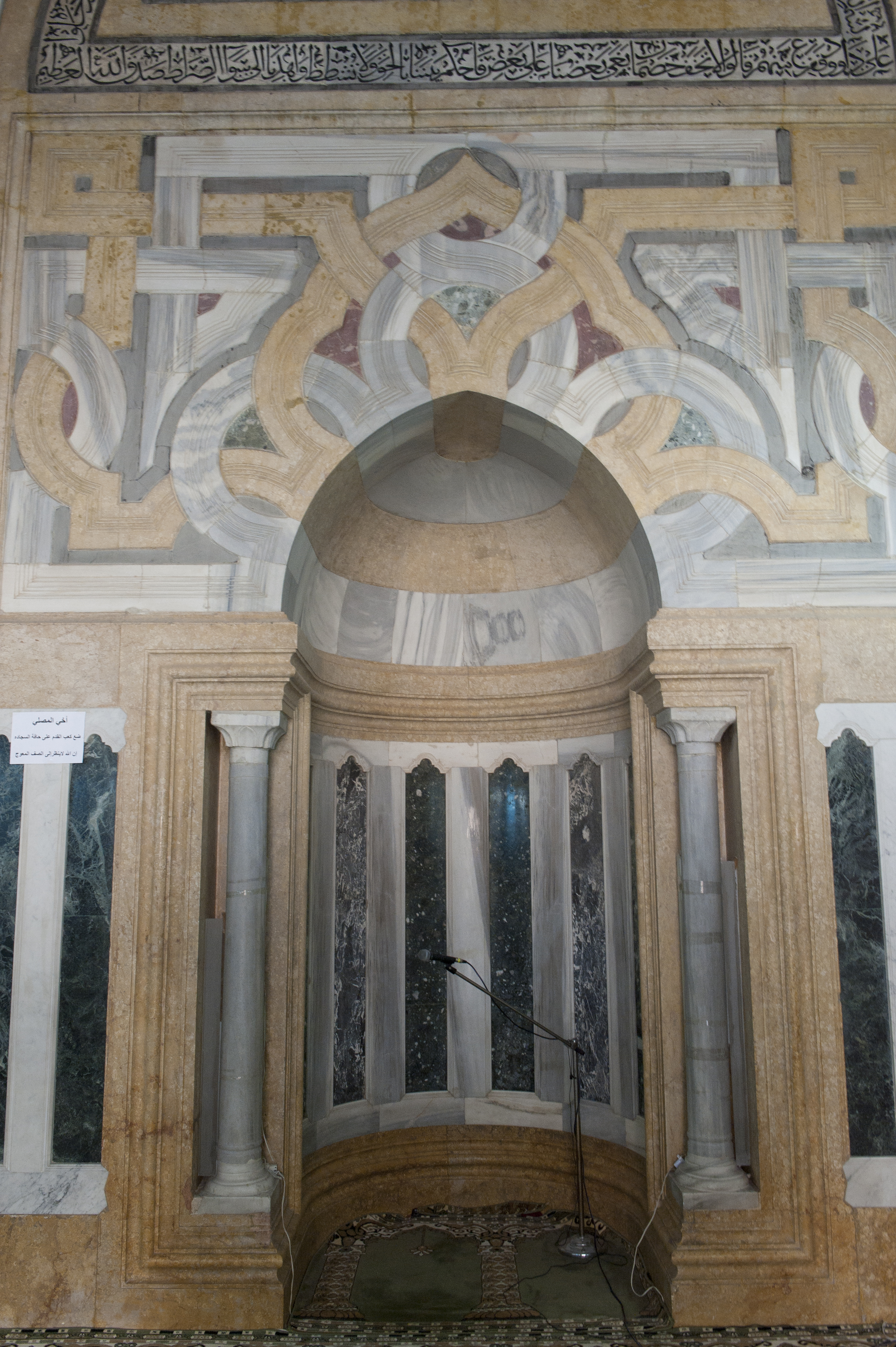
Polychrome marble mosaic work on the mihrab of the Al-Firdaws Madrasa in Aleppo (13th century, Ayyubid period)

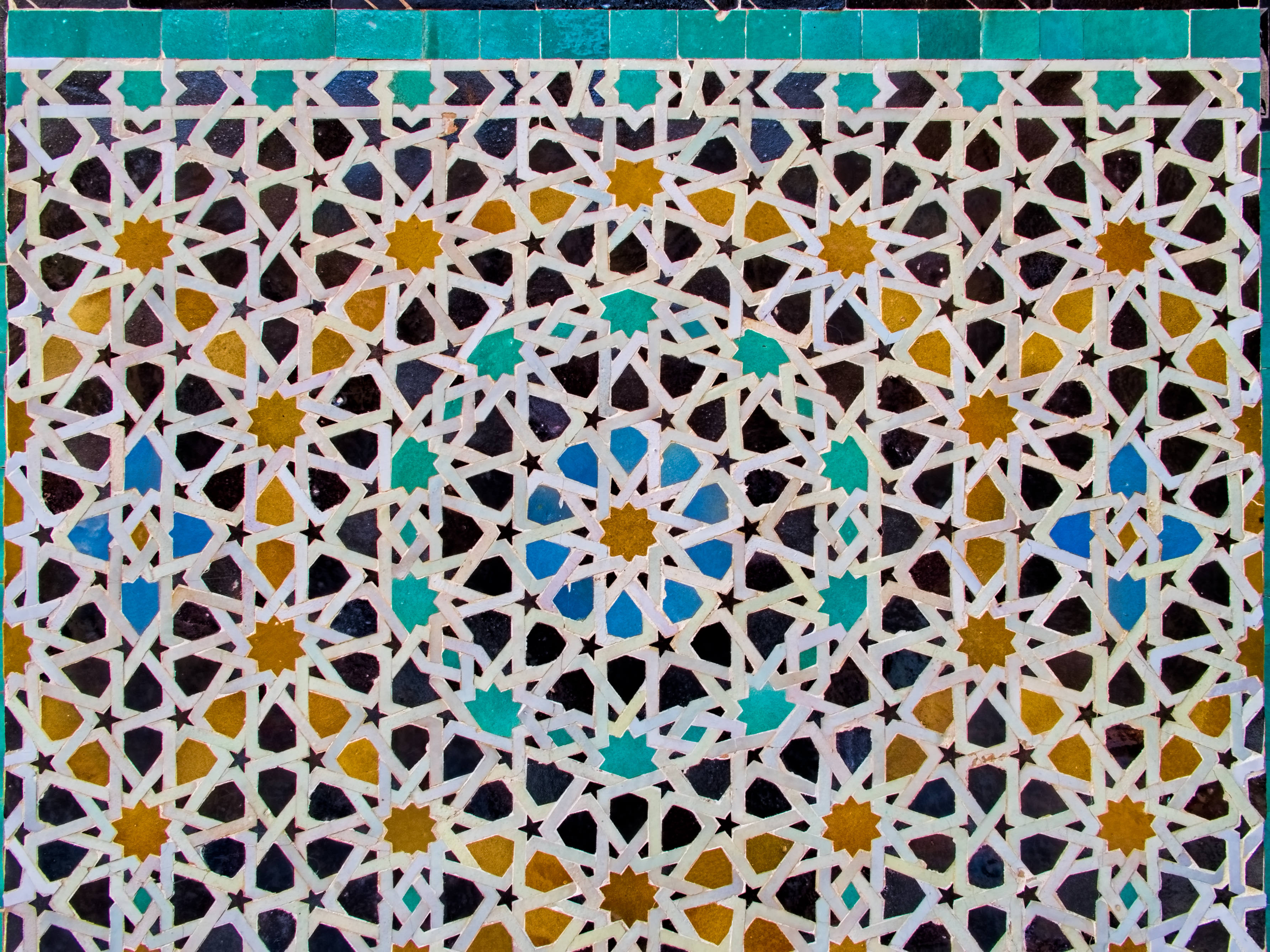
Complex geometric motifs in zellij (mosaic tilework) at the Bou Inania Madrasa in Fez (14th century, Marinid period)

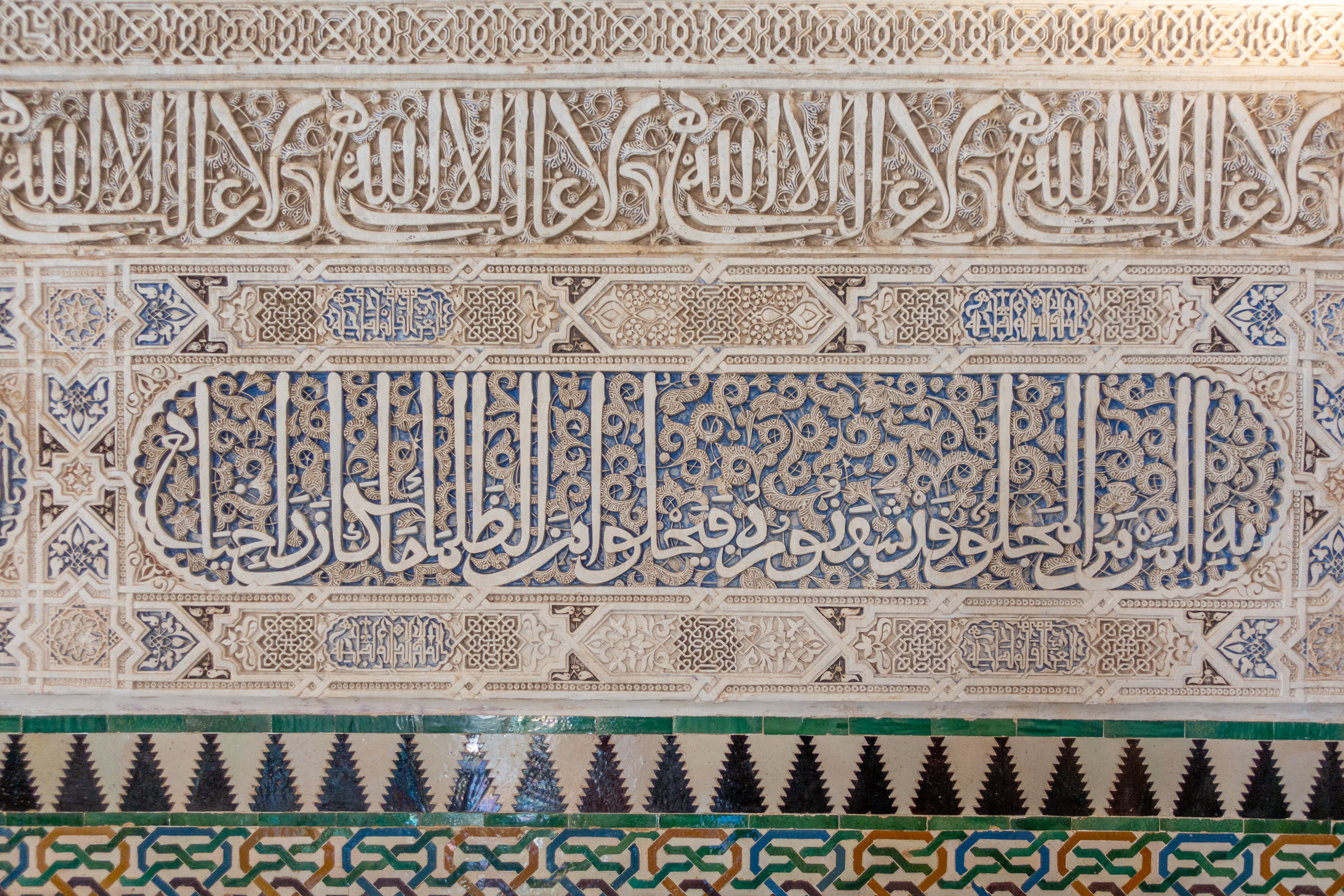
Calligraphic inscriptions and arabesques carved in stucco in the Alhambra (14th century, Nasrid period)

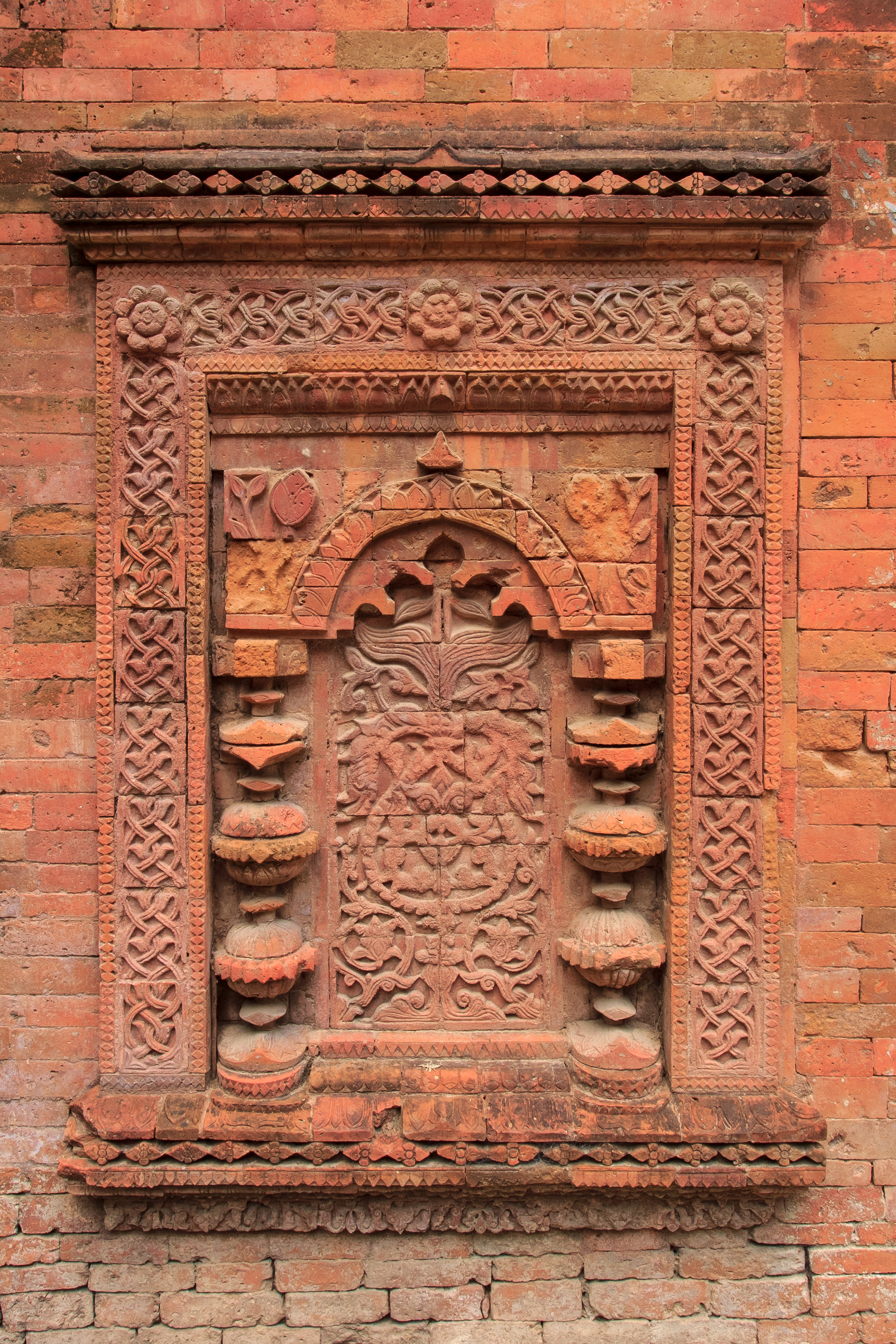
Terracotta arabesque of Khania Dighi Mosque in Nawabganj district of Bangladesh (15th century, Bengal Sultanate period)

Carved stone and ablaq masonry in the portal of the al-Ghuri Khanqah in Cairo (early 16th century, Mamluk period)

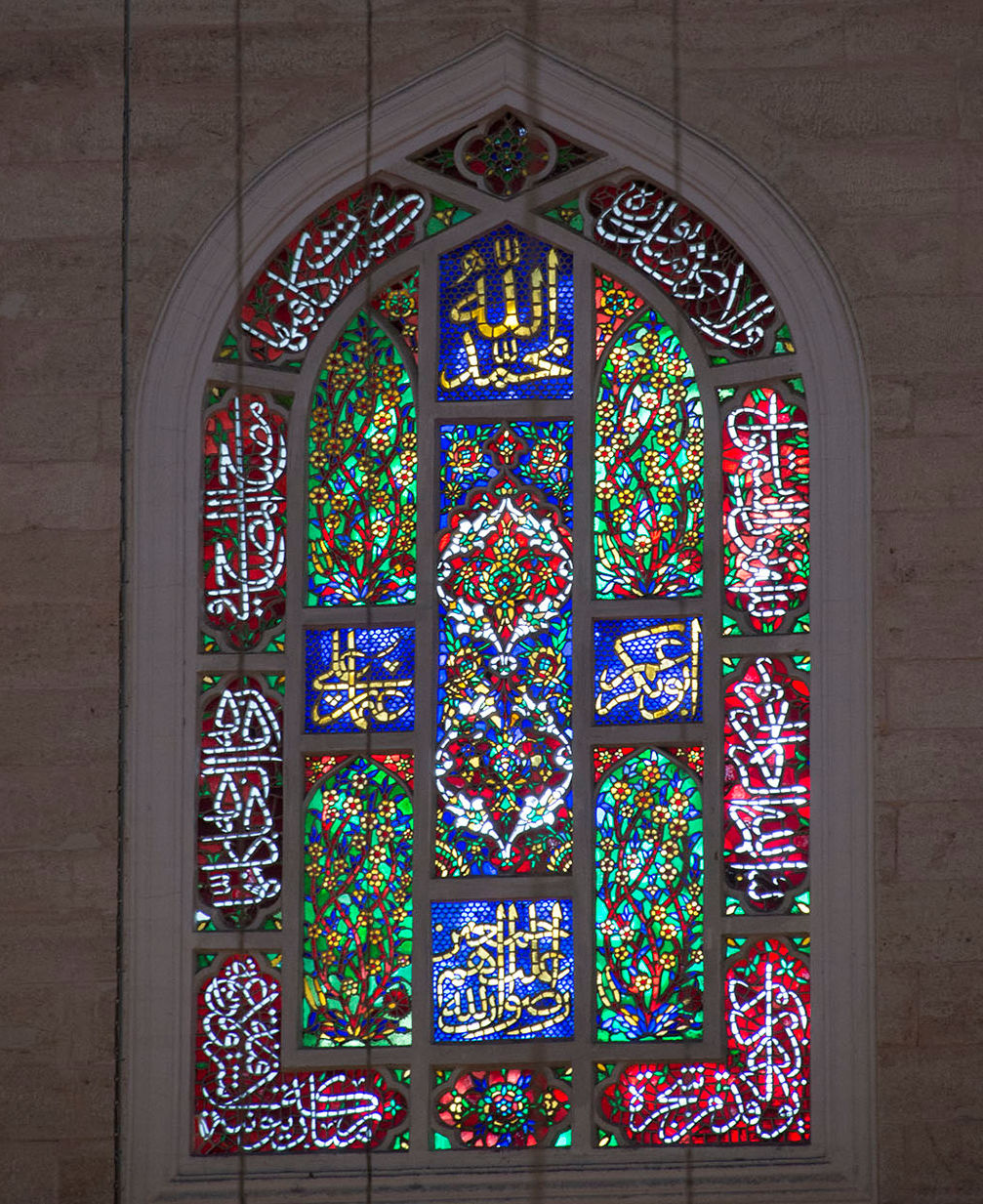
Stained glass window in the Süleymaniye Mosque in Istanbul (16th century, Ottoman period)

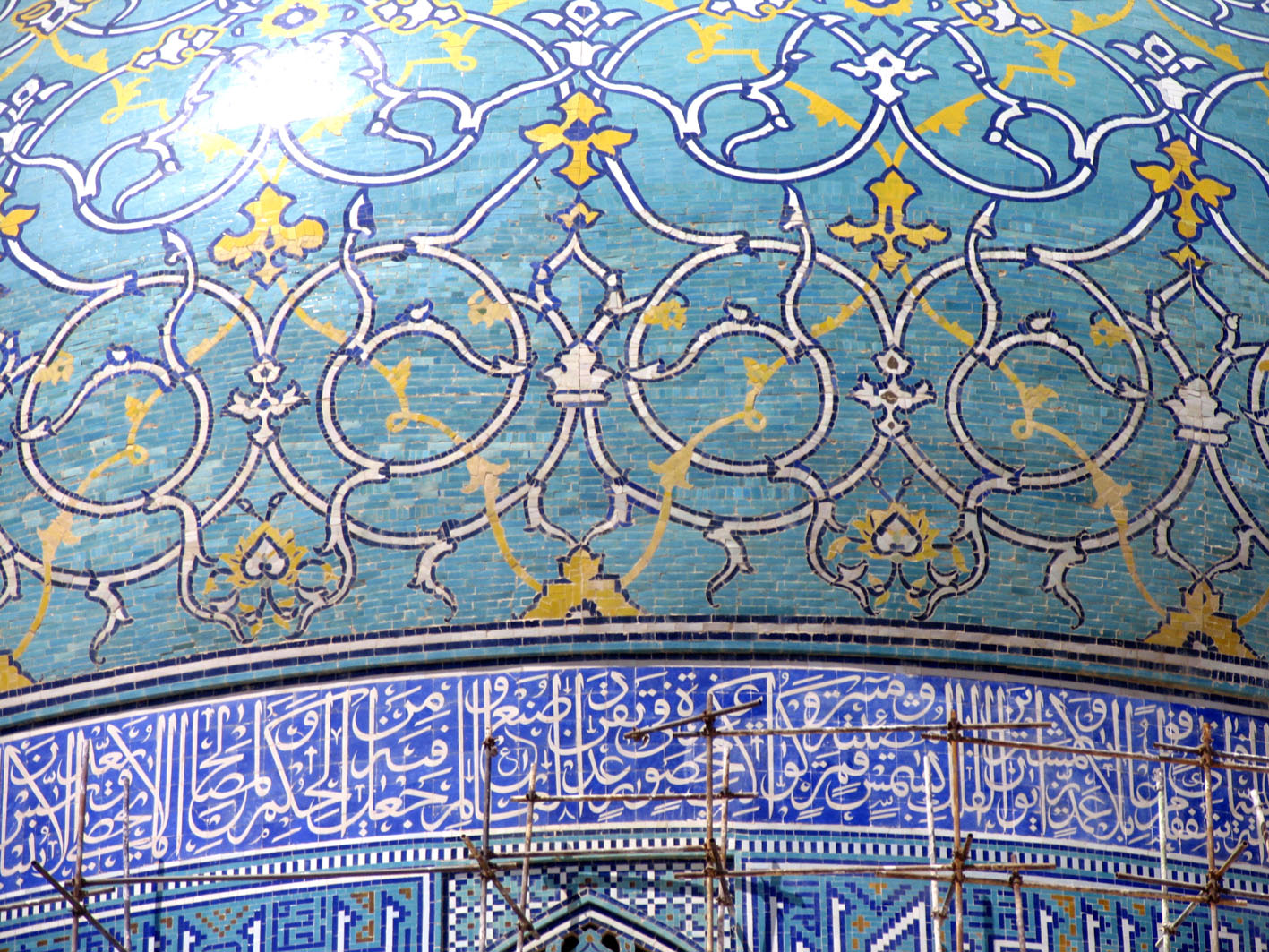
Arabesque and calligraphic decoration on tile-covered dome of Shah Mosque in Isfahan (17th century, Safavid period)

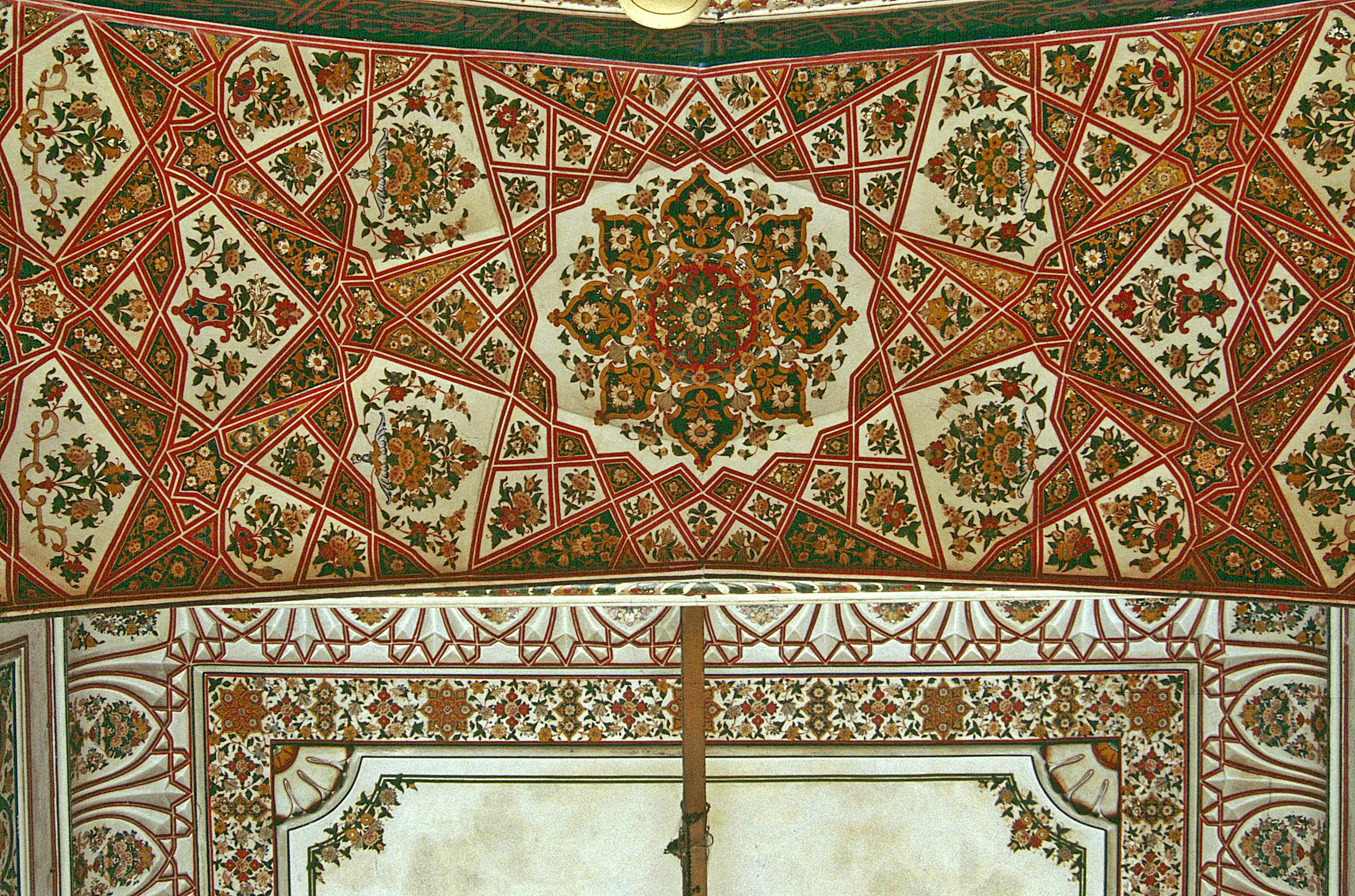
Painted ceiling in the Mahabat Khan Mosque in Peshawar (17th century, Mughal period)

=== Muqarnas ===
Muqarnas is a three-dimensional sculpted motif created by the geometric subdivision of a vaulting structure into miniature, superimposed pointed-arch substructures or niches, also known as "honeycomb" or "stalactite" vaults. They can be made from different materials like stone, brick, wood or stucco. The earliest monuments to make use of this feature date from the 11th century and are found in Iraq, North Africa, Iran, Central Asia, and Upper Egypt. This apparently near-simultaneous development in distant regions of the Islamic world has led to multiple scholarly theories about their origin and spread, with one current theory proposing that they originated in one region at least a century earlier and then spread from there. Some of the earliest surviving examples preserved in situ are tripartite squinches used as transitional elements for domes and semi-domes, such as at the Arab-Ata Mausoleum (977–978) in Tim (Uzbekistan), the Gunbad-i Qabus (1006–1007) in northeastern Iran, and the Duvazdah Imam Mausoleum (1037–1038) in Yazd. From the 12th century onward its usage became common across the Islamic world and different local styles developed over time. In addition to serving as squinches and pendentives, muqarnas was also employed to decorate cornices, portals, mihrabs, windows, arches, and entire domes.

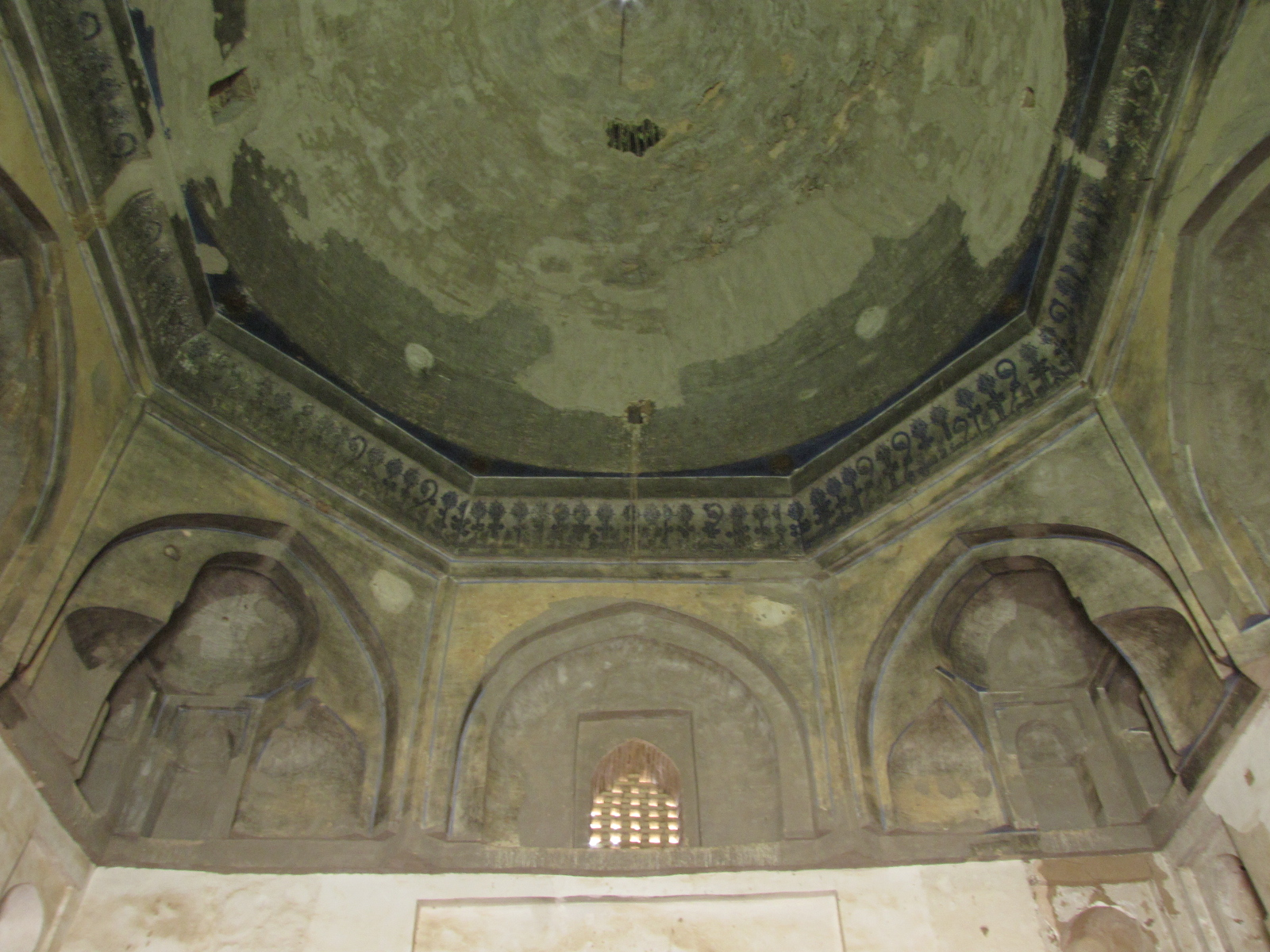
Early example of basic tripartite muqarnas squinches under the dome of the Duvazdah Imam Mausoleum in Yazd (1037–8)

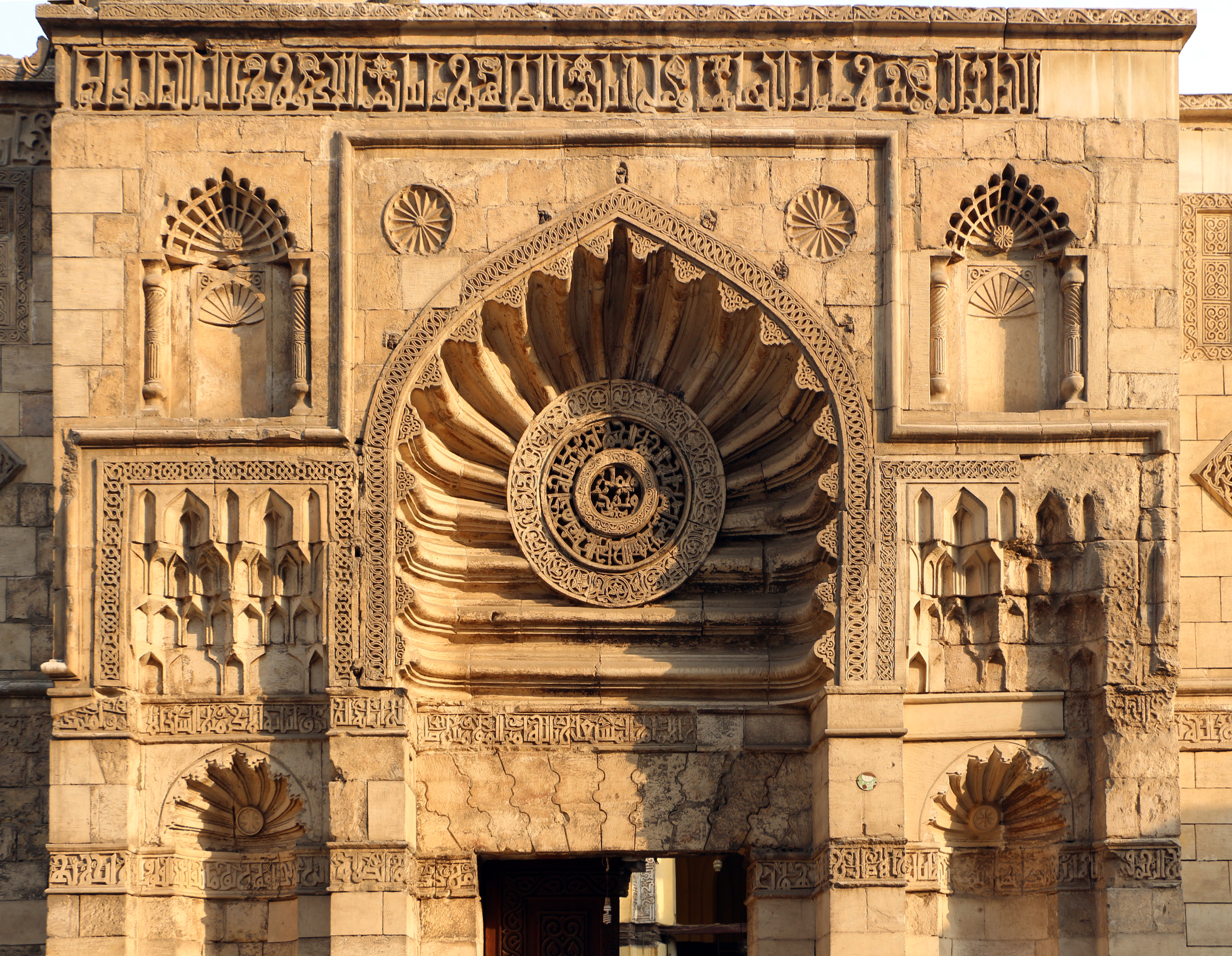
Muqarnas niches (left and right) on the façade of the Aqmar Mosque in Cairo (1125–6, Fatimid)

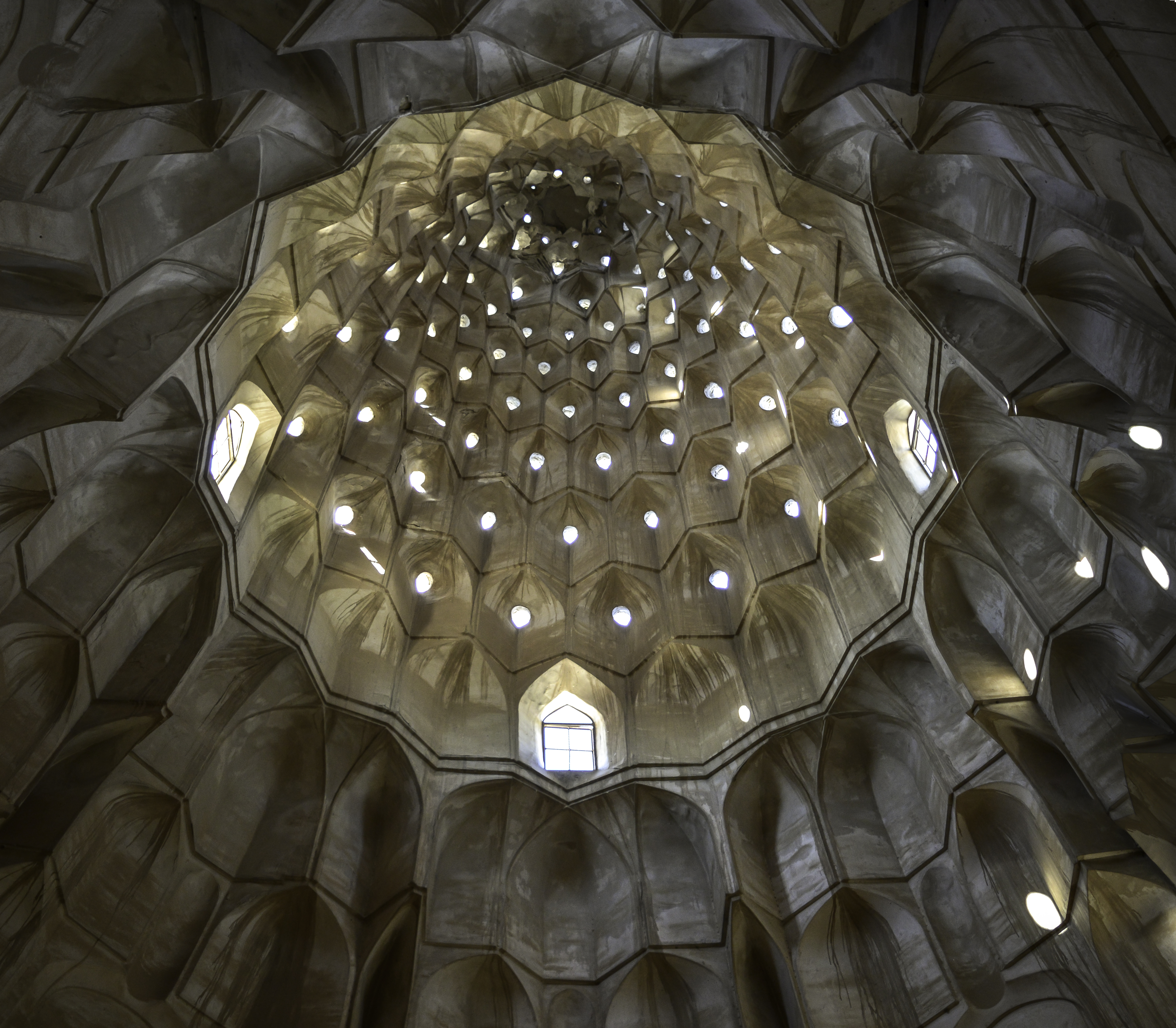
Muqarnas dome in the Mausoleum of Zumurrud Khatun (before 1202, Abbasid)

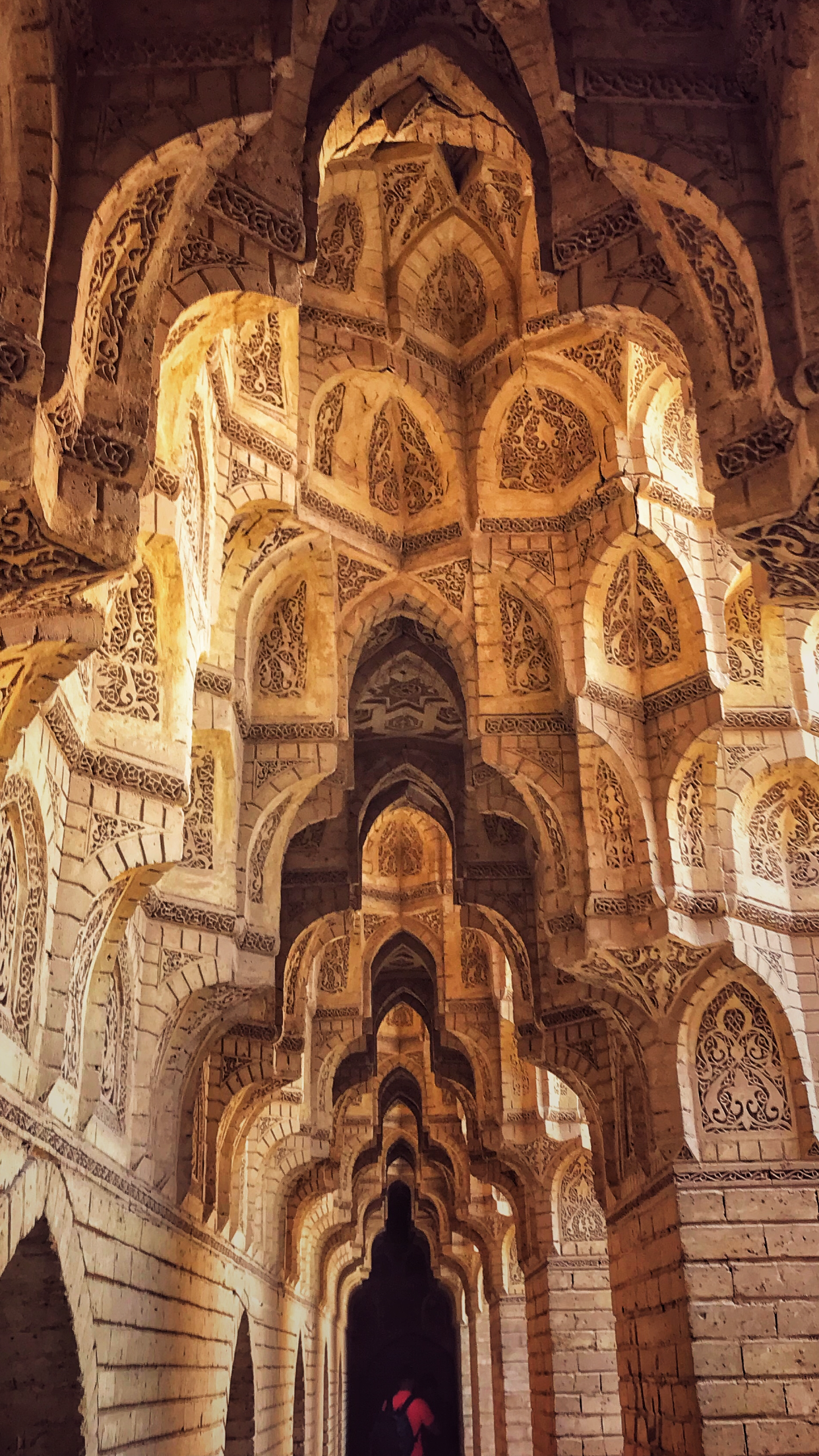
Muqarnas corridor in the Abbasid Palace in Baghdad (12th or 13th century, Abbasid)

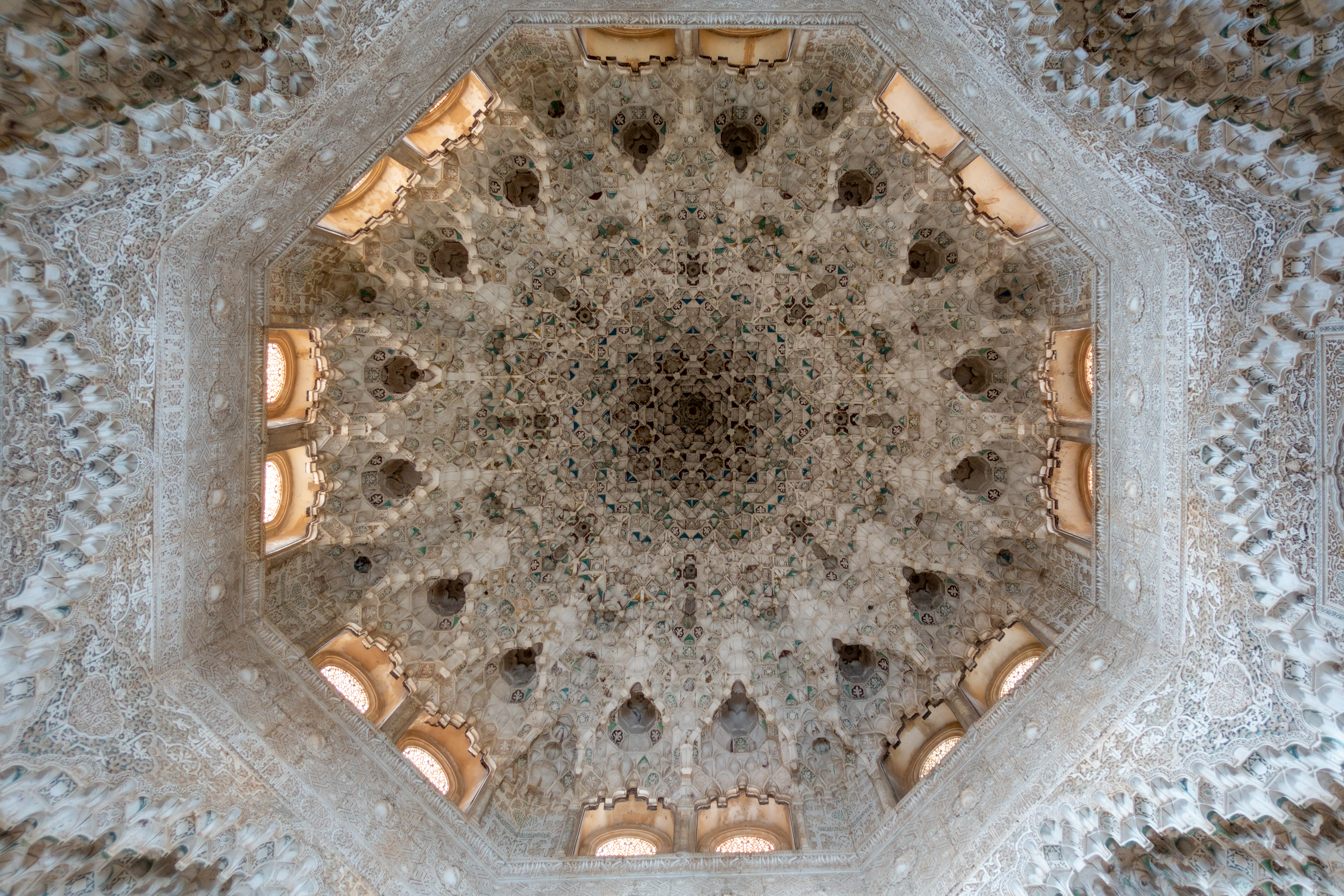
Muqarnas dome in the Palace of the Lions in the Alhambra, Granada (14th century, Nasrid period)

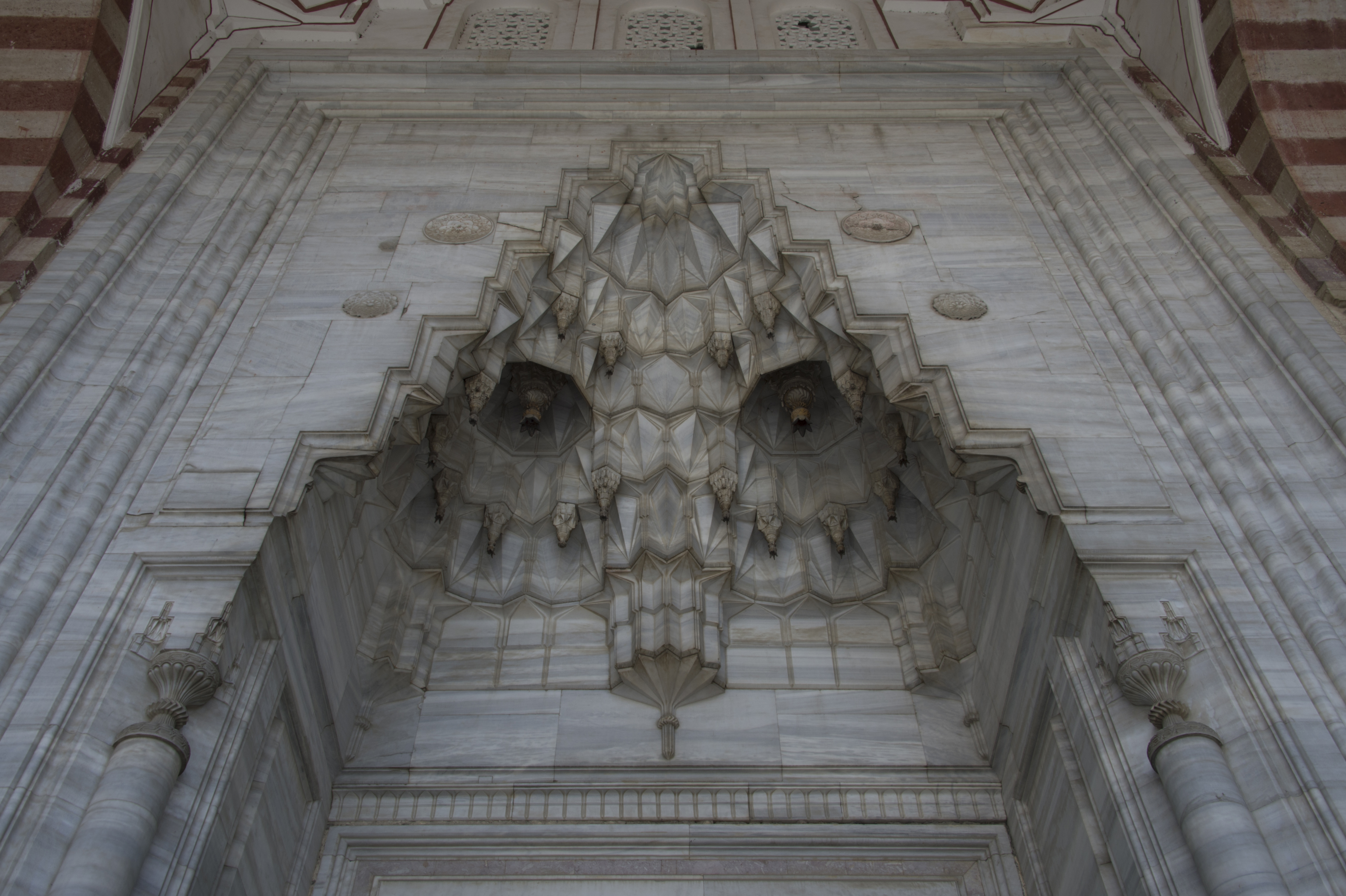
Entrance portal with muqarnas at the Selimiye Mosque in Edirne (late 16th century, Ottoman period)

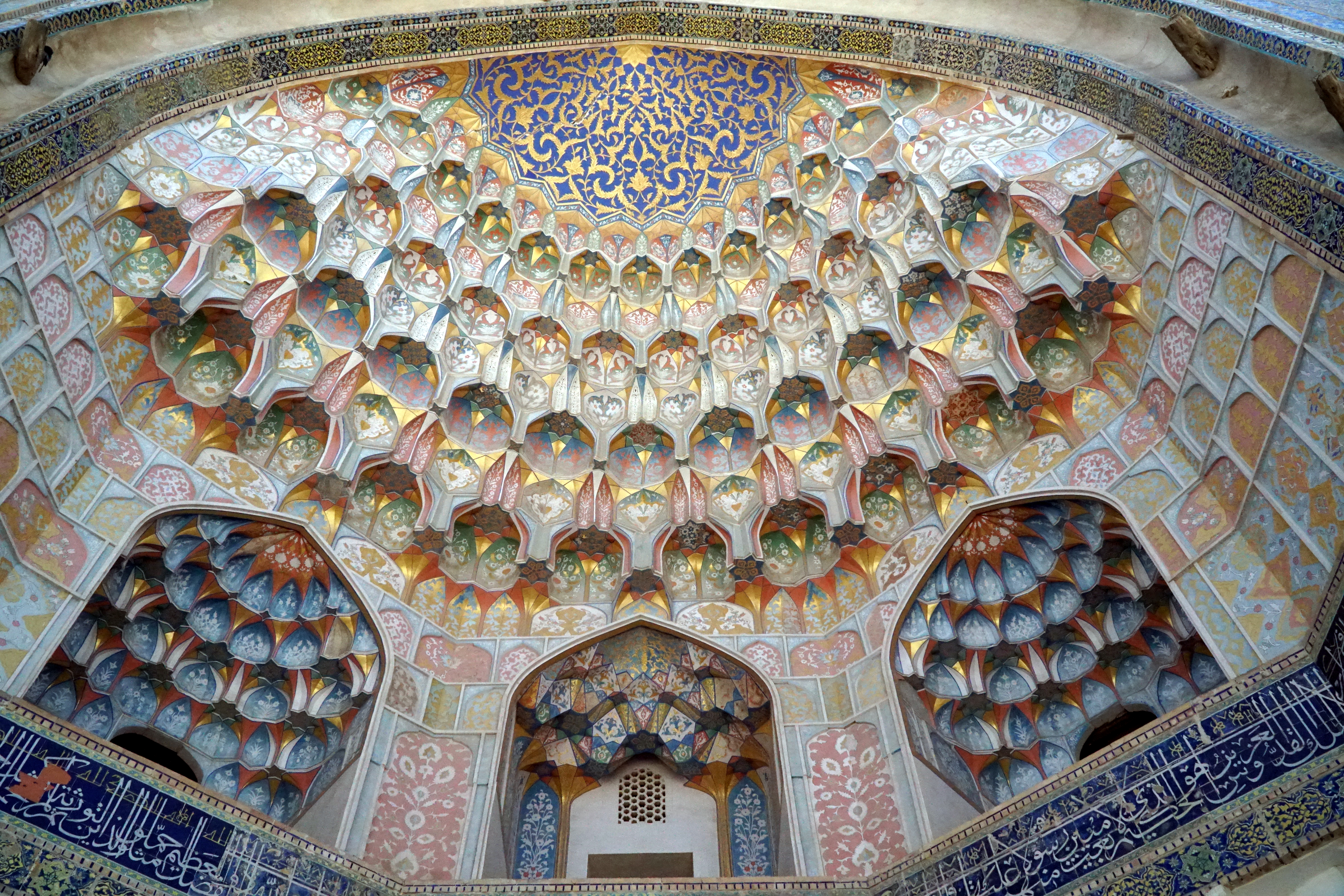
Muqarnas in the entrance portal of the Madrasa of 'Abd al-'Aziz in Bukhara (17th century, Khanate of Bukhara)

=== Balconies and screens ===
Balconies are a common feature of Islamic domestic architecture due to the warm climates in most countries. One of the mosque recognizable types is the mashrabiya, a wooden lattice screen which projects from the side of a building and which protected privacy by allowed those inside to look outside without being visible from outside. The mashribiya also acts as a regulator of indoor temperatures by enhancing air circulation and reducing relative humidity in old Hejazi houses. Another type of lattice screen, not restricted to balconies, is the jali, which is common to Indo-Islamic architecture and is made of perforated stone. Other examples of balconies and related structures include the jharokha in Rajasthani and Indo-Islamic architecture and the mirador, a Spanish term applied to a balcony or lookout pavilion in Andalusi palaces like the Alhambra. Balconies also became an architectural element inside some mosques, such as the hünkâr mahfili in Ottoman mosques, a separate and protected space where the sultan could perform his prayers (similar to a maqsura). A similar feature is also found in the Bara Gunbad complex (late 15th century) in Delhi.

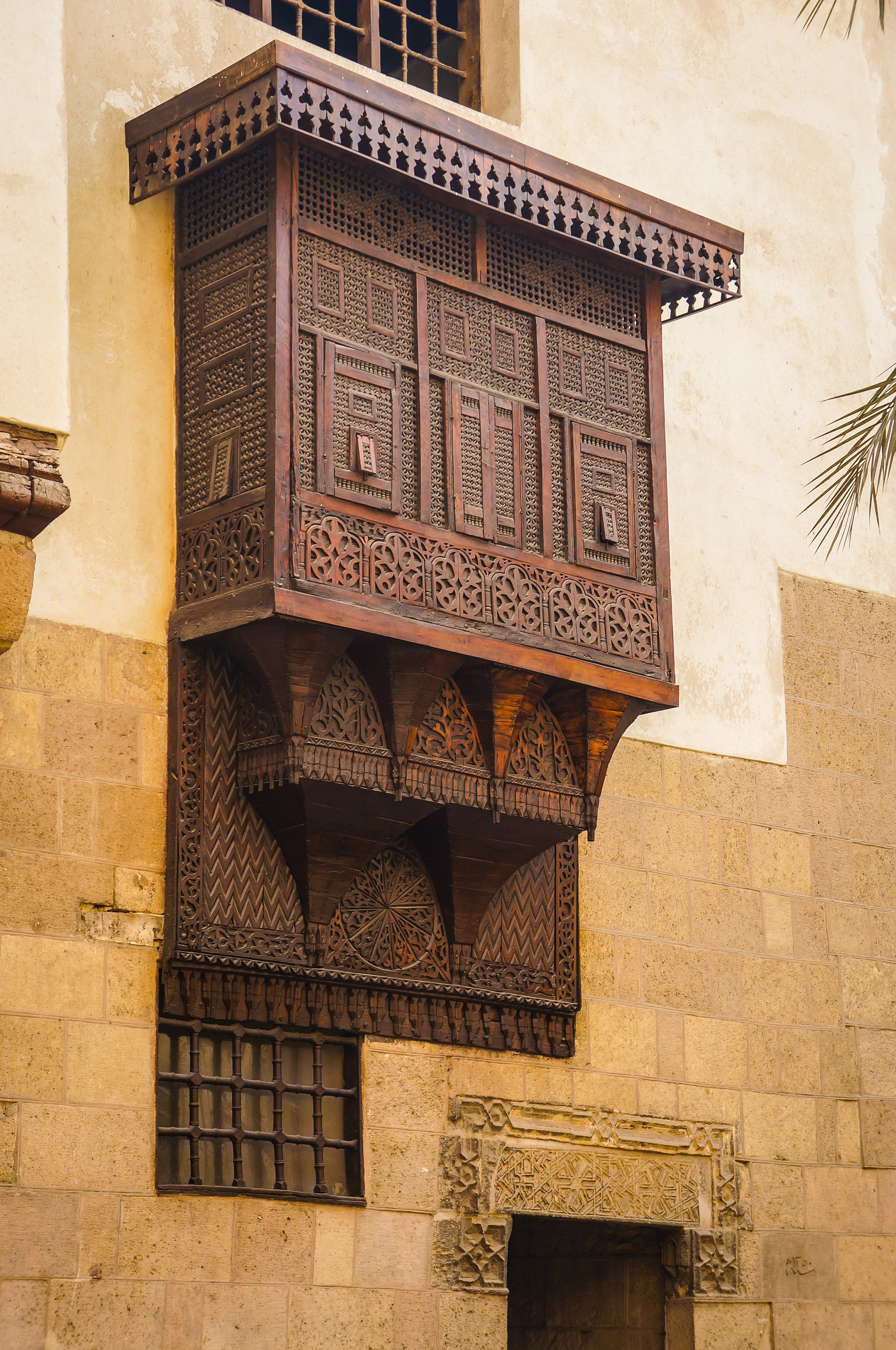
Mashrabiya balcony in Bayt al-Suhaymi in Cairo

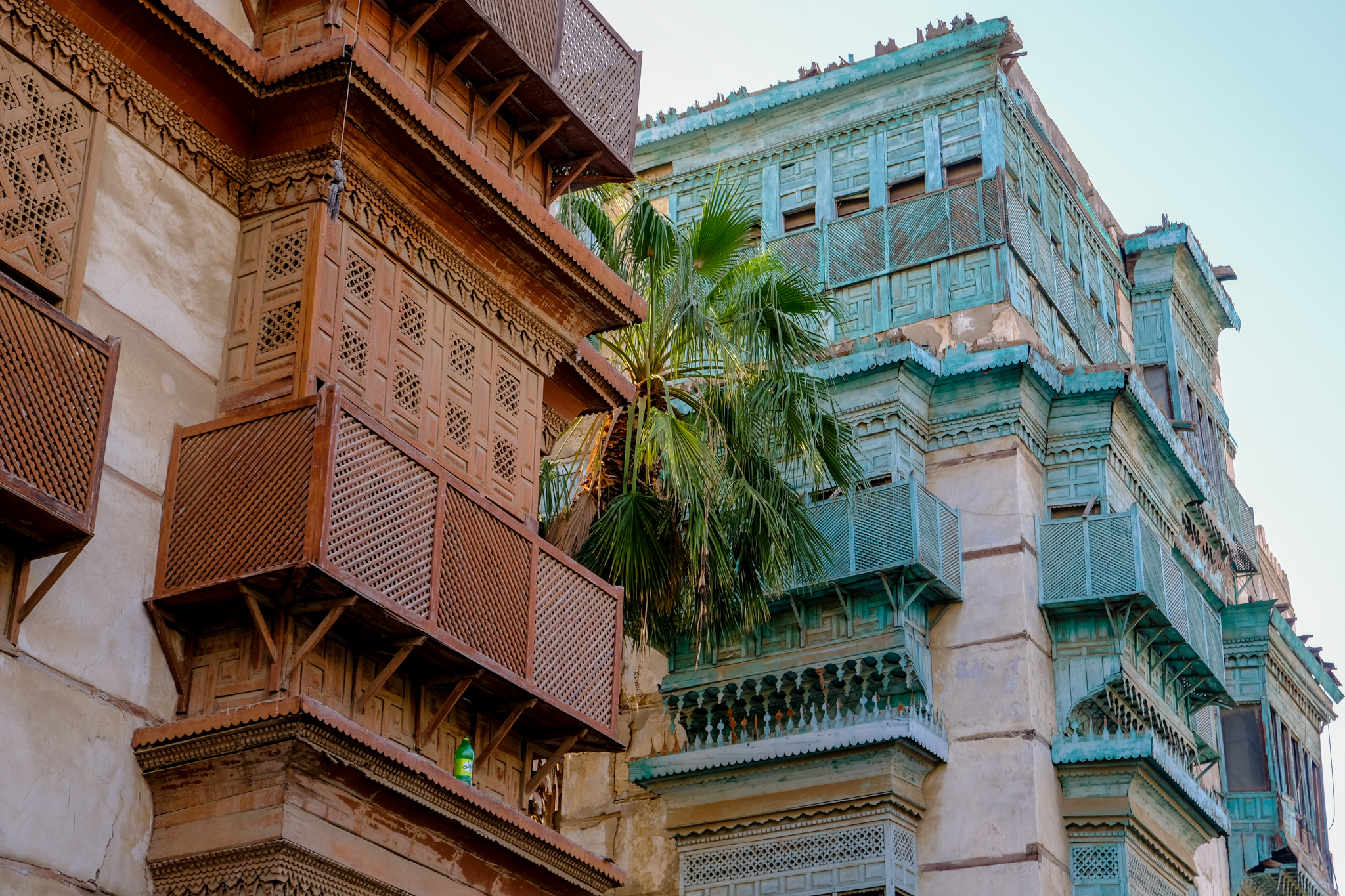
Mashrabiya windows and Roshan balconies in Old Jeddah, Saudi Arabia

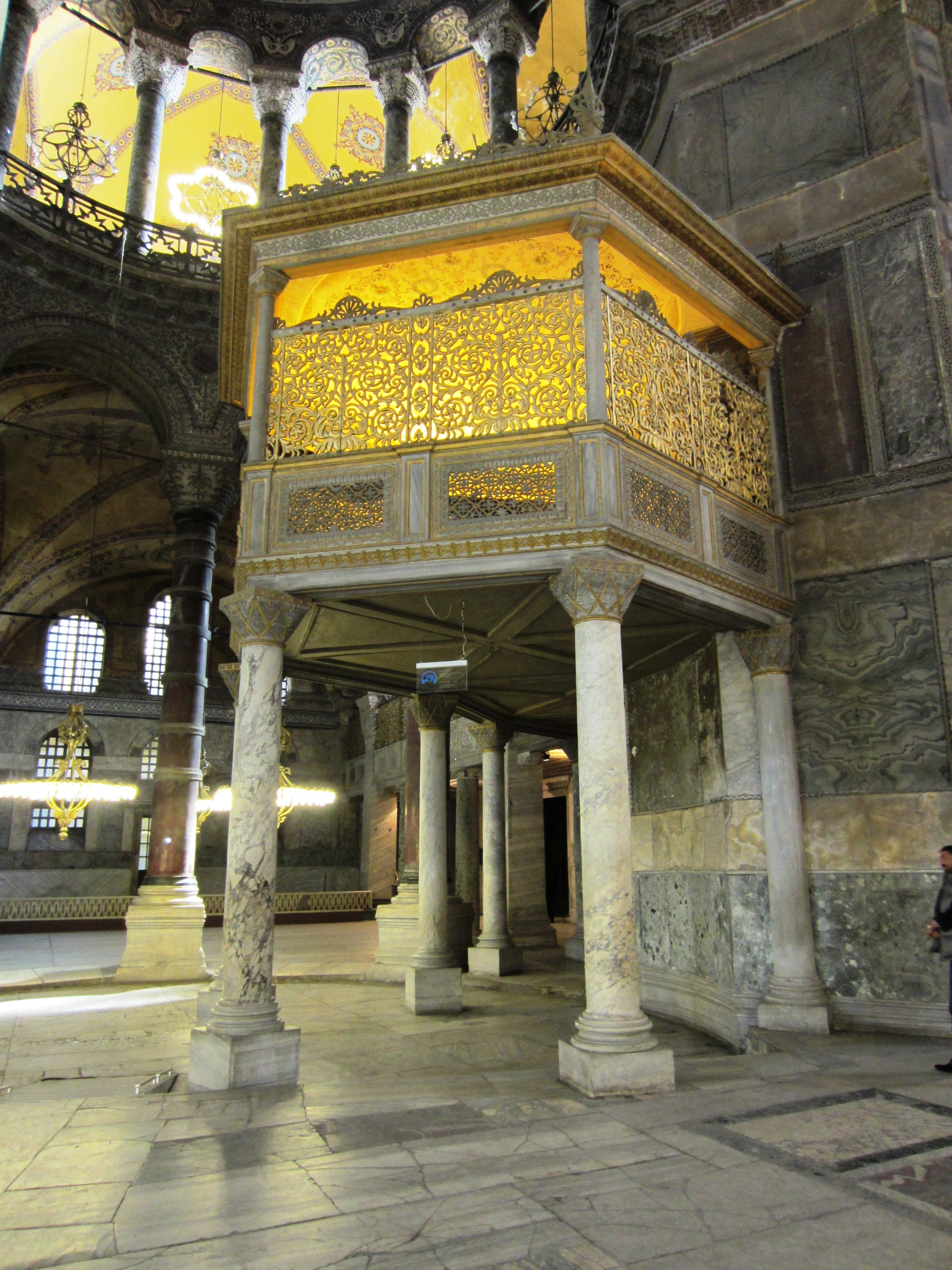
Hünkâr Mahfili (prayer space for the sultan) inside the Hagia Sophia in Istanbul

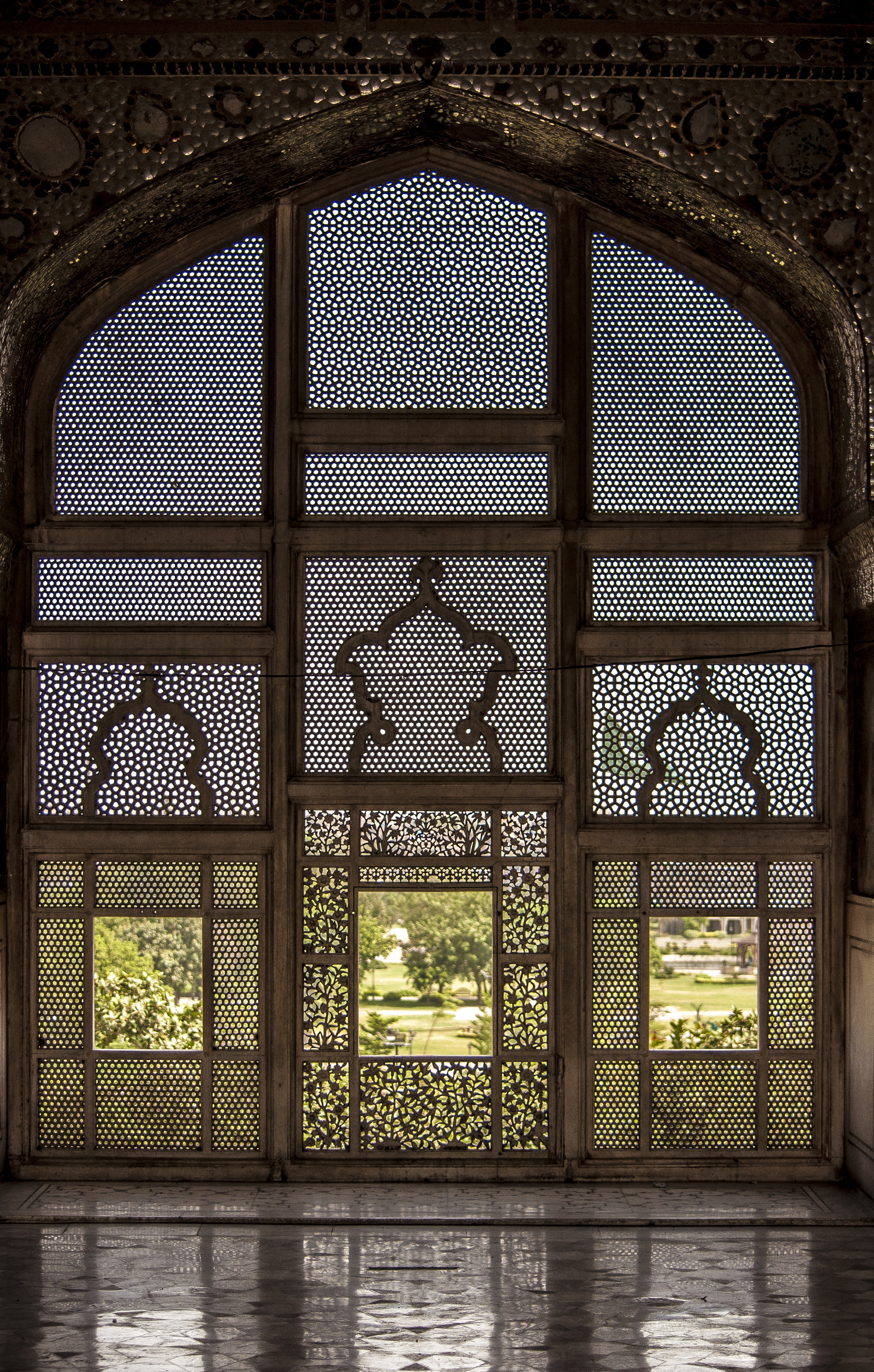
Use of jali screen at Lahore Fort, Pakistan

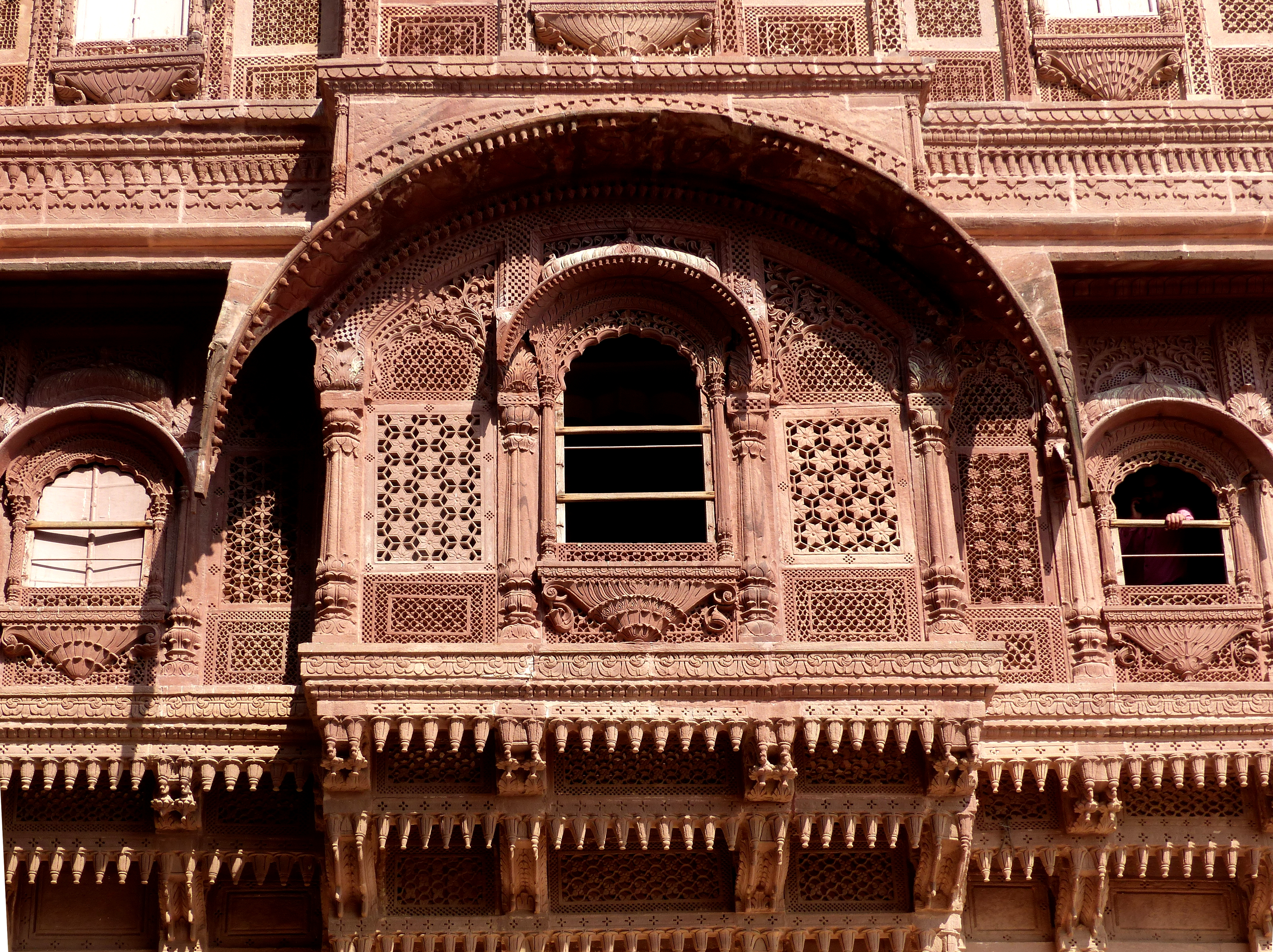
Jharokha balcony at Mehrangarh Fort in Jodhpur, India

=== Other elements of religious architecture ===
==== Qibla orientation ====
The qiblah (قِـبْـلَـة) is the direction in which Mecca is from any given location, towards which Muslims face during prayers. Within Islamic architecture it is a major component of both the features and the orientation of the building itself. Mosques and religious structures are built to have one side aligned with this direction, usually marked by a visual feature called a mihrab. The layout of some Muslim cities may have also been influenced by this orientation. In practice, however, the qibla alignments of mosques built in different periods and locations do not all point to the same place. This is due to discrepancies in the calculations of the Islamic scientists in the past who determined where Mecca was from their individual locations. Scholars note that these differences come about for a multitude of reasons, such as some misunderstanding the meaning of qibla itself, the fact that the geographic coordinates of the past do not line up with the coordinates of today, and that the determination of this direction was more an astronomical calculation, rather than a mathematical one. Early mosques were constructed according to either the calculations of what direction qibla was approximately, or with the mihrab facing south, as that was the direction that Muhammad was facing when he prayed in Medina, which is a city directly north of Mecca.

==== Mihrab ====
The mihrab is a niche or alcove, typically concave, set into the qibla wall (the wall standing in the direction of prayer) of a mosque or other prayer space. It symbolized and indicated the direction of the qibla to worshippers. It also acquired ritual and ceremonial importance over time, and its shape was even used as a symbol on some coinage. The very first mosques did not have mihrabs; the first known concave mihrab niche was the one added to the Prophet's Mosque in Medina by Caliph al-Walid I in 706 or 707. In later mosques the mihrab evolved to become the usual focus of architectural decoration in the building. The details of its shape and materials varied from region to region. In congregational mosques, the mihrab was usually flanked by a minbar (pulpit), and some historical mosques also included a nearby maqsura (a protected space for the ruler during prayers).

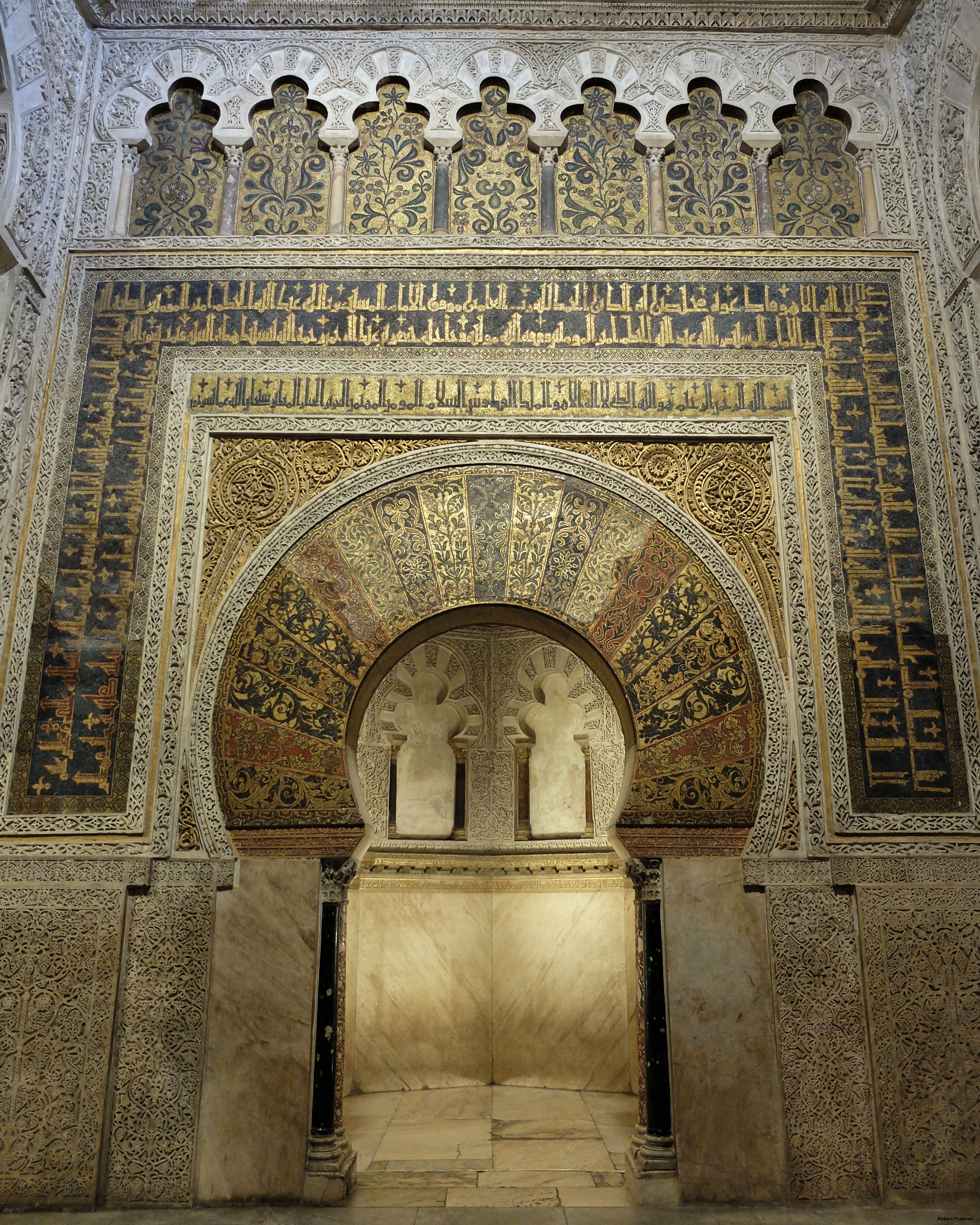
Mihrab of the Great Mosque of Cordoba (10th century)

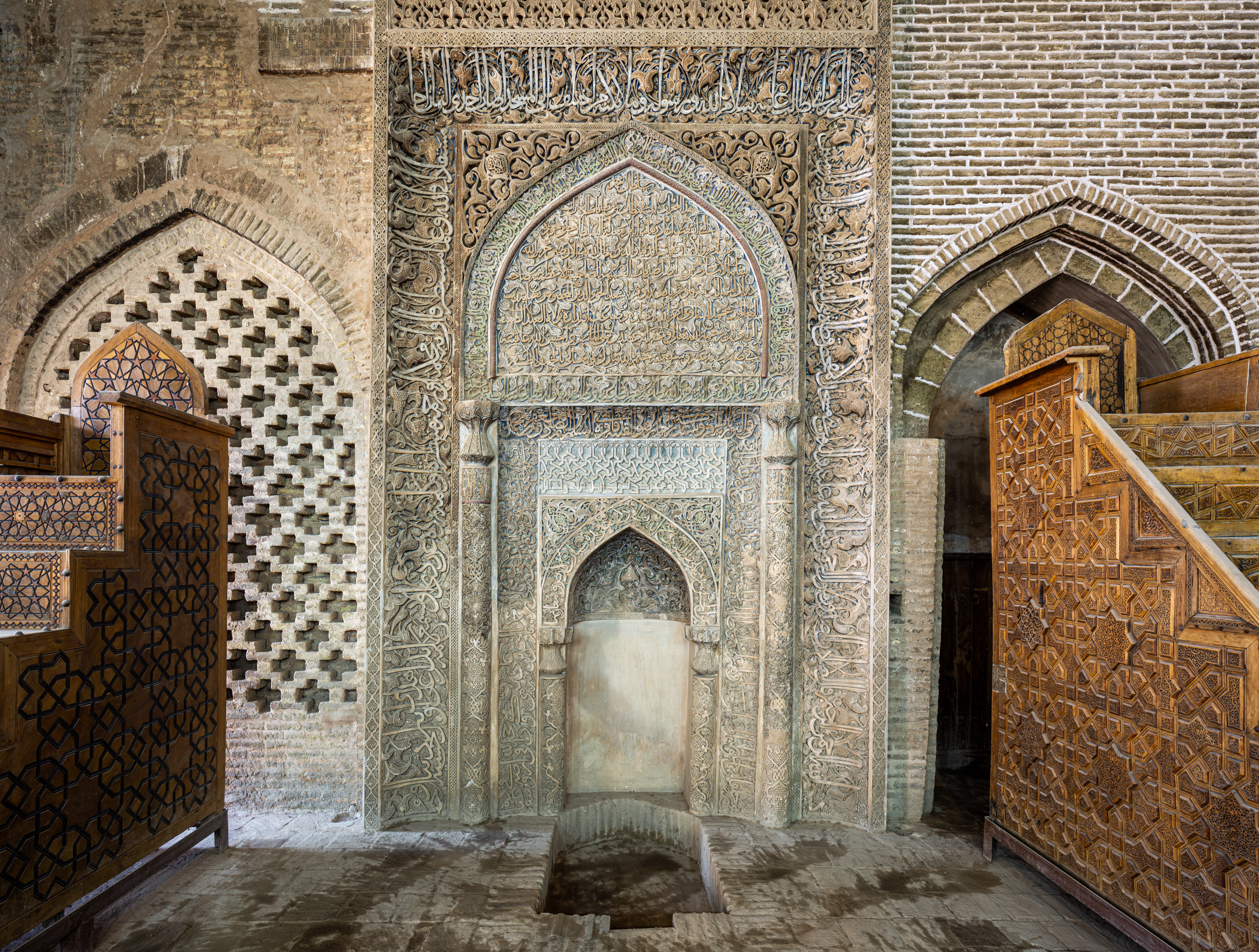
Stucco-carved mihrab of Uljaytu at the Jameh Mosque of Isfahan (early 14th century)

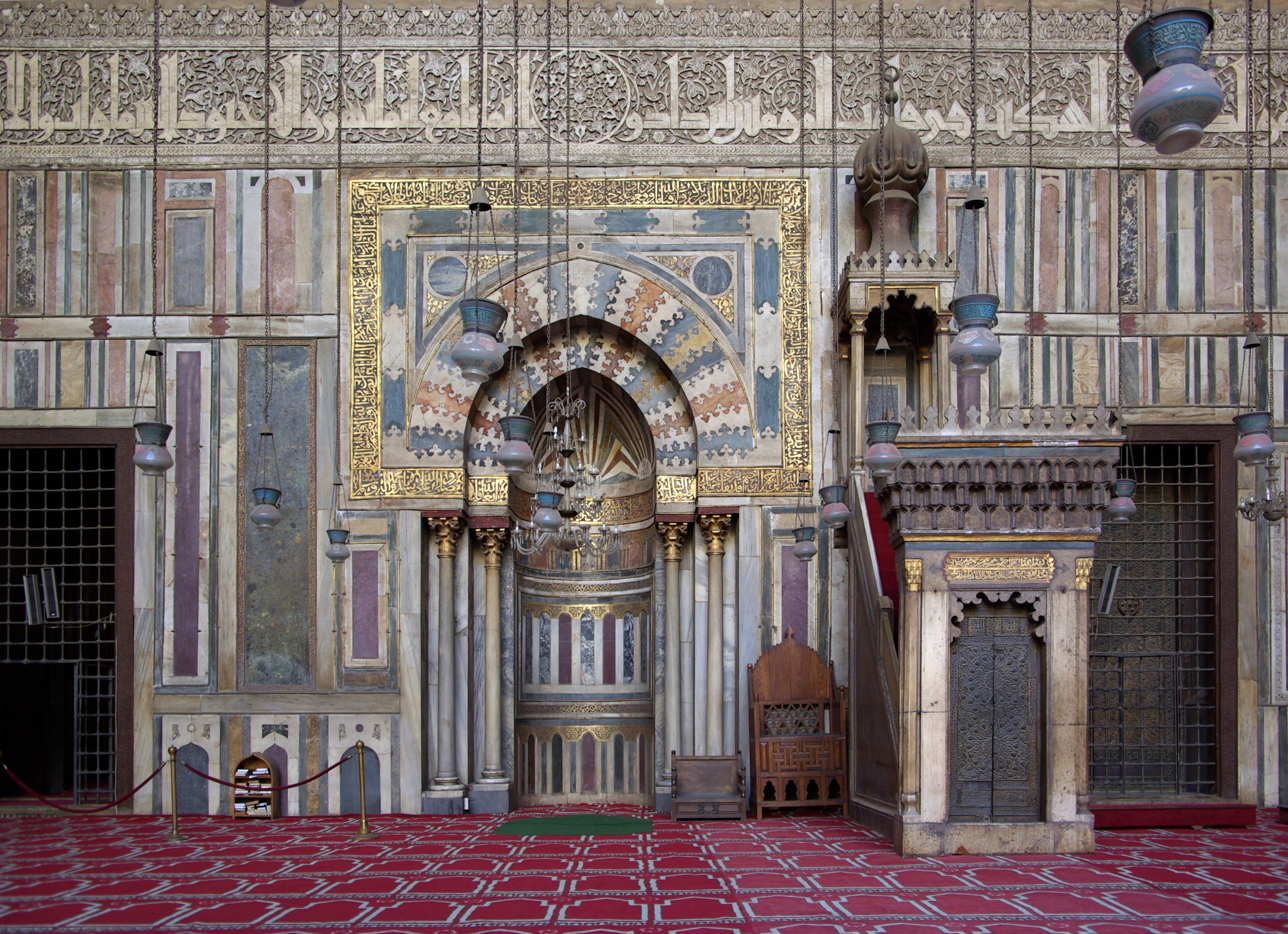
Mihrab of the Mosque-Madrasa of Sultan Hasan in Cairo (14th century)

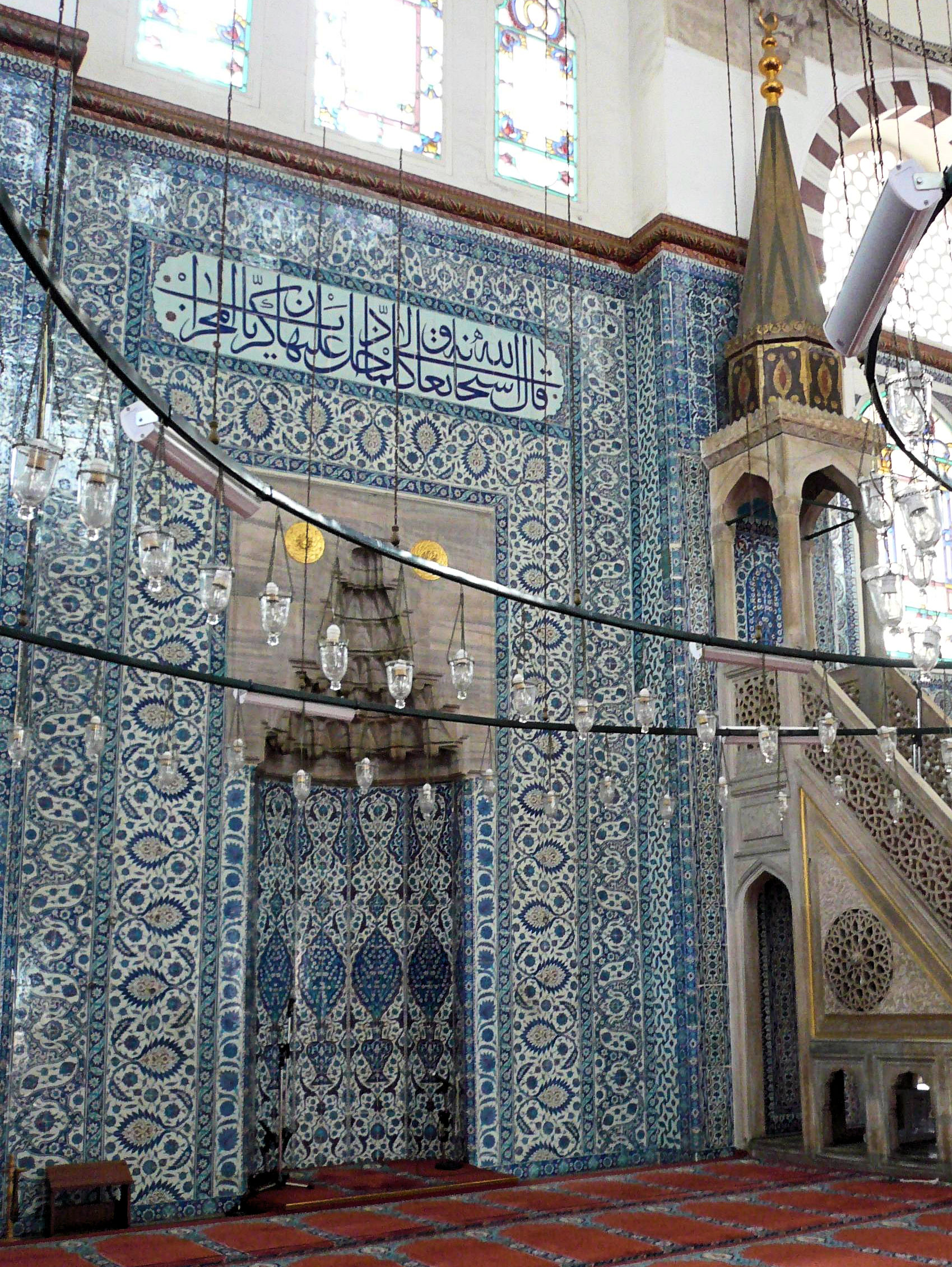
Ottoman mihrab with Iznik tiles in the Rüstem Pasha Mosque, Istanbul (16th century)

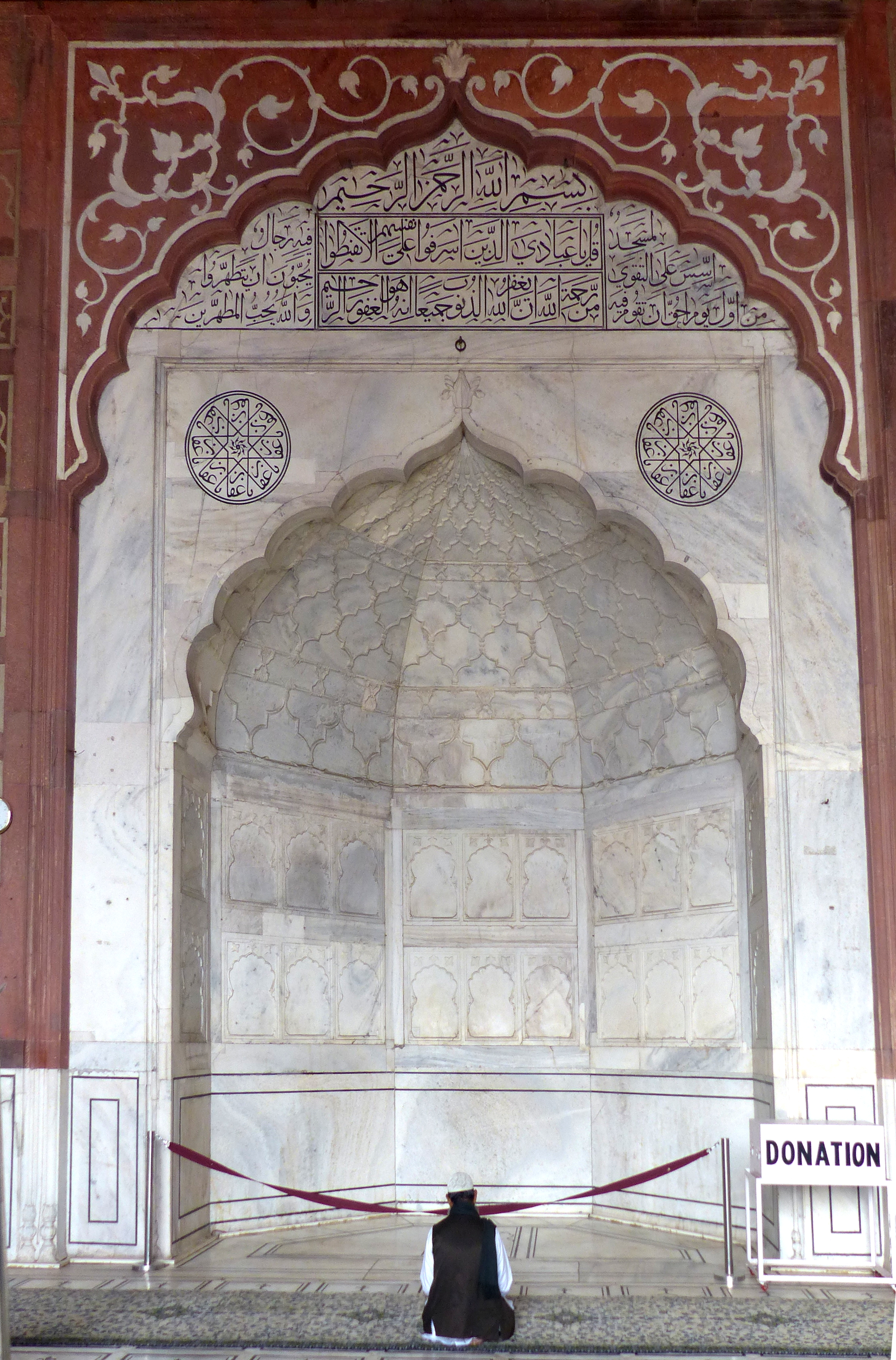
Mihrab of the Jama Masjid in Delhi (mid-17th century)

==== Minaret ====
The minaret is a tower that traditionally accompanies a mosque building. Its formal function is to provide a vantage point from which the call to prayer, or adhān, is made. The call to prayer is issued five times each day: dawn, noon, mid-afternoon, sunset, and night. In most modern mosques, the adhān is made directly from the prayer hall and broadcast via microphone to a speaker system on the minaret.

The origin of the minaret and its initial functions are not clearly known and have long been a topic of scholarly discussion. The earliest mosques lacked minarets, and the call to prayer was often performed from smaller tower structures. The early Muslim community of Medina gave the call to prayer from the doorway or the roof of the house of Muhammad, which doubled as a place for prayer. The first confirmed minarets in the form of towers date from the early 9th century under Abbasid rule and they did not become a standard feature of mosques until the 11th century. These first minaret towers were placed in the middle of the wall opposite the qibla wall. Among them, the minaret of the Great Mosque of Kairouan in Tunisia, dating from 836, is one of the oldest surviving minarets in the world and the oldest in North Africa. It has the shape of a massive tower with a square base, three levels of decreasing widths, and a total height of 31.5 meters.

Minarets have had various forms (in general round, squared, spiral or octagonal) depending on the period and architectural tradition. The number of minarets by mosques is not fixed; originally one minaret would accompany each mosque, but some architectural styles can include multiple minarets.

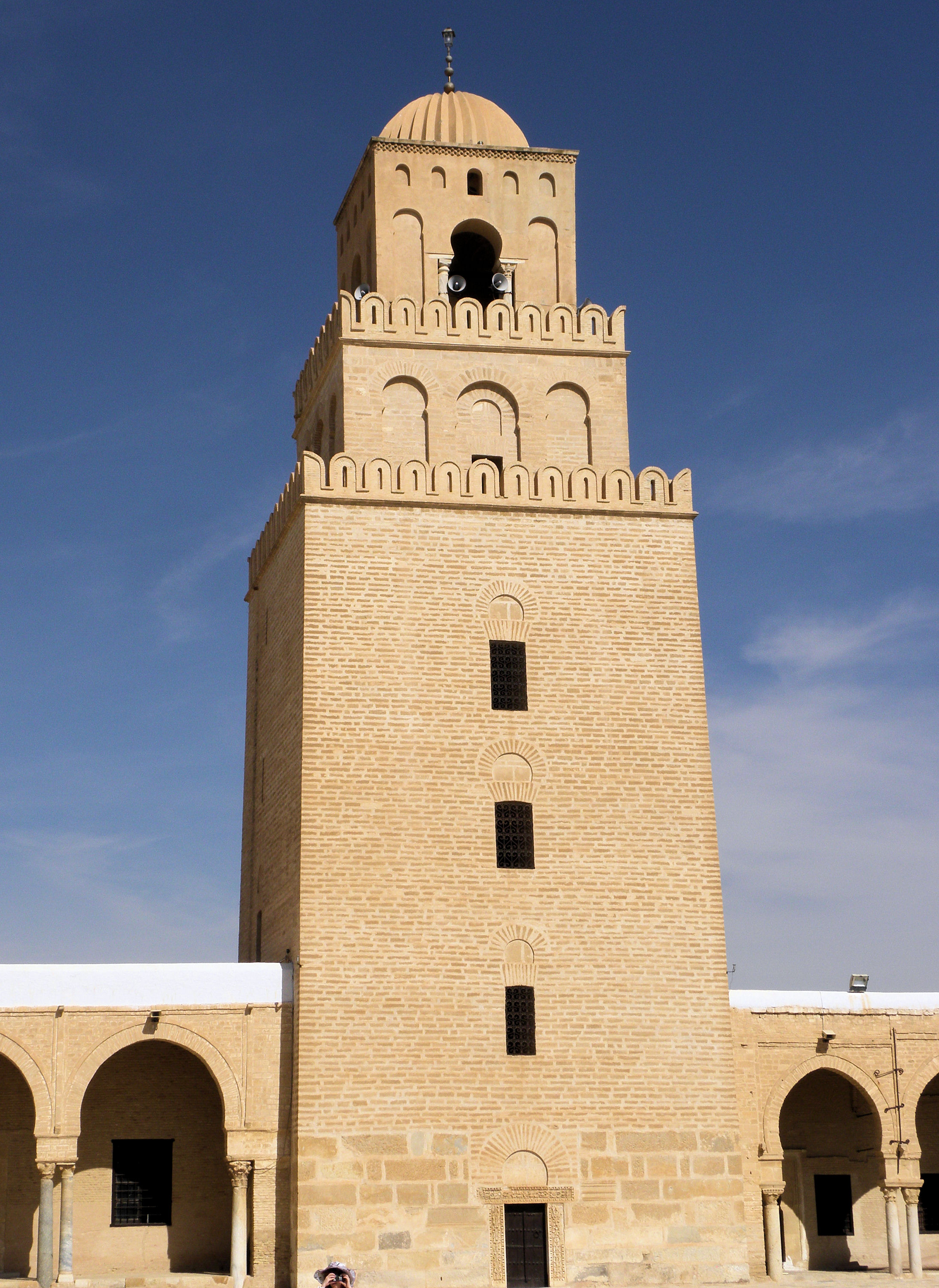
Minaret of the Great Mosque of Kairouan (early 9th century)

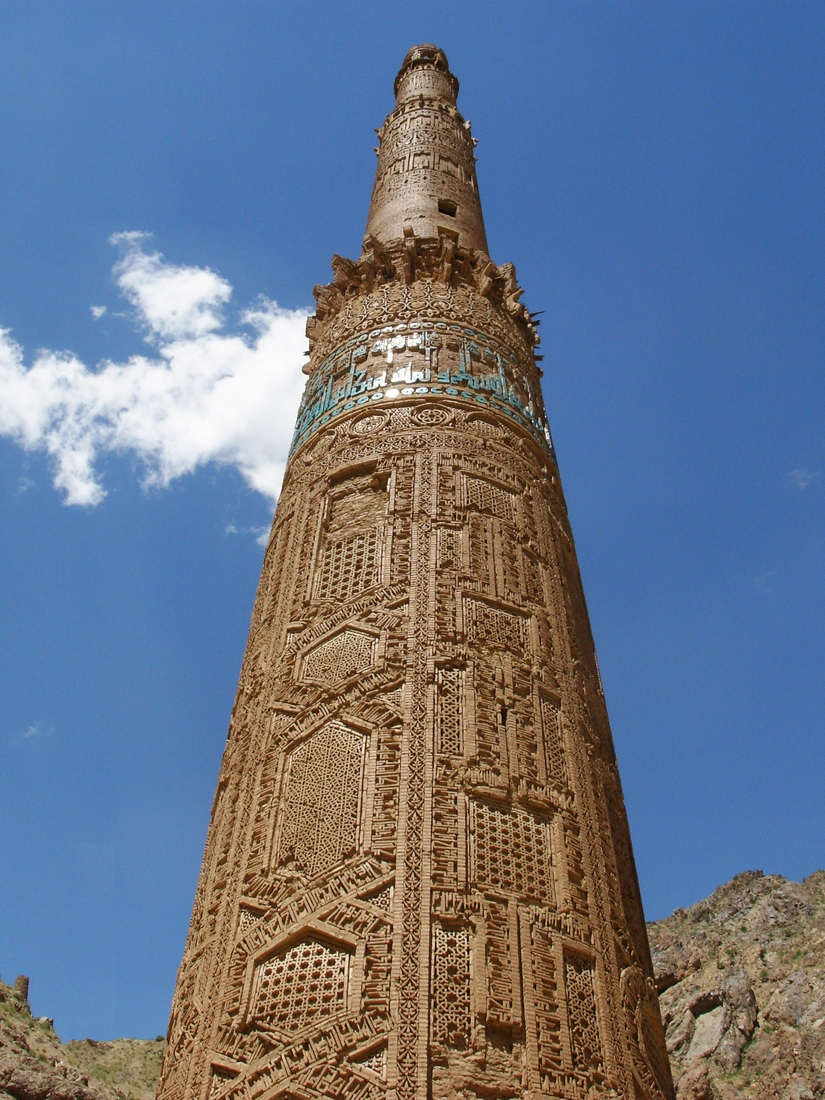
Minaret of Jam, Afghanistan (12th century)

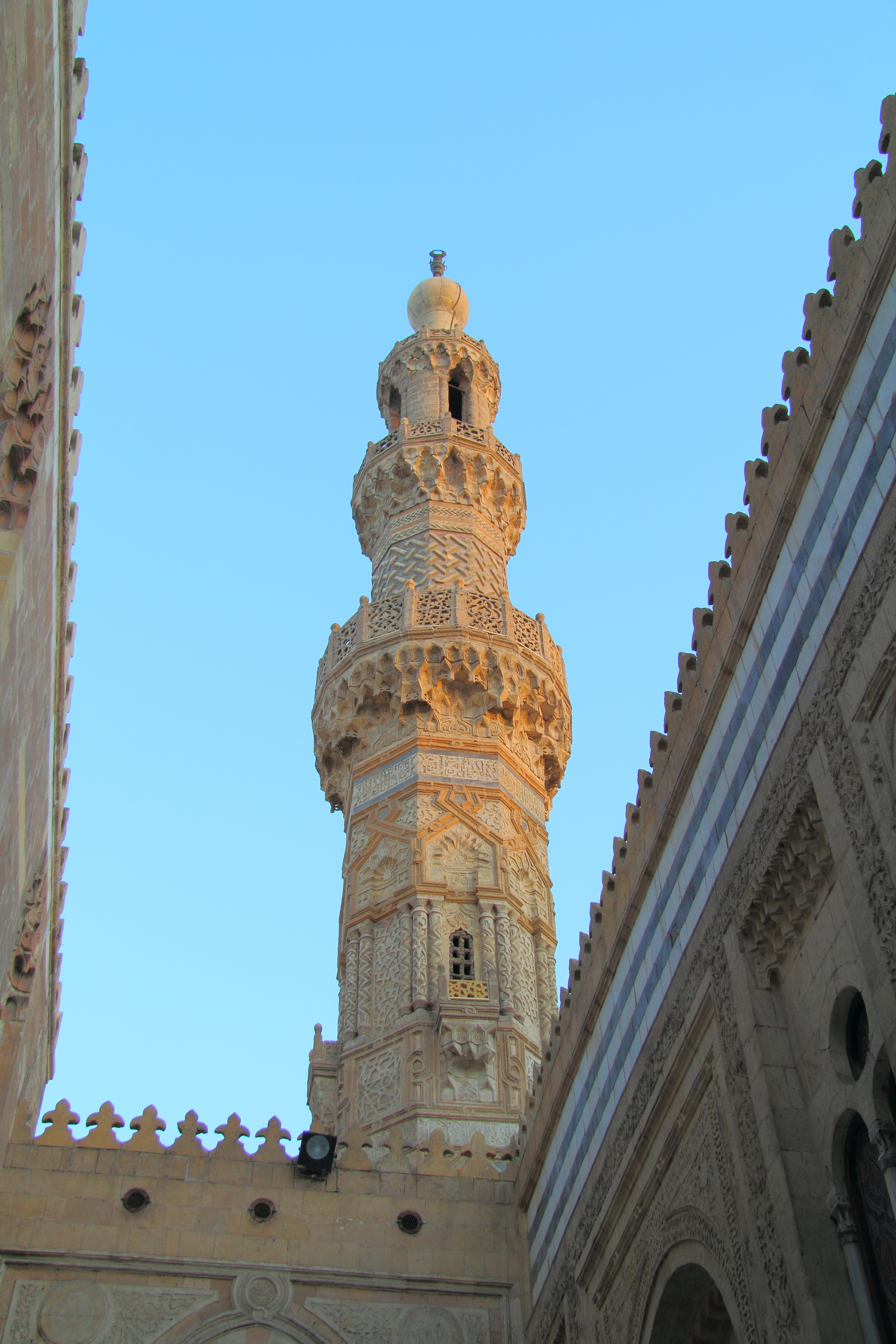
Minaret of Sultan Qaytbay (15th century) at the al-Azhar Mosque in Cairo

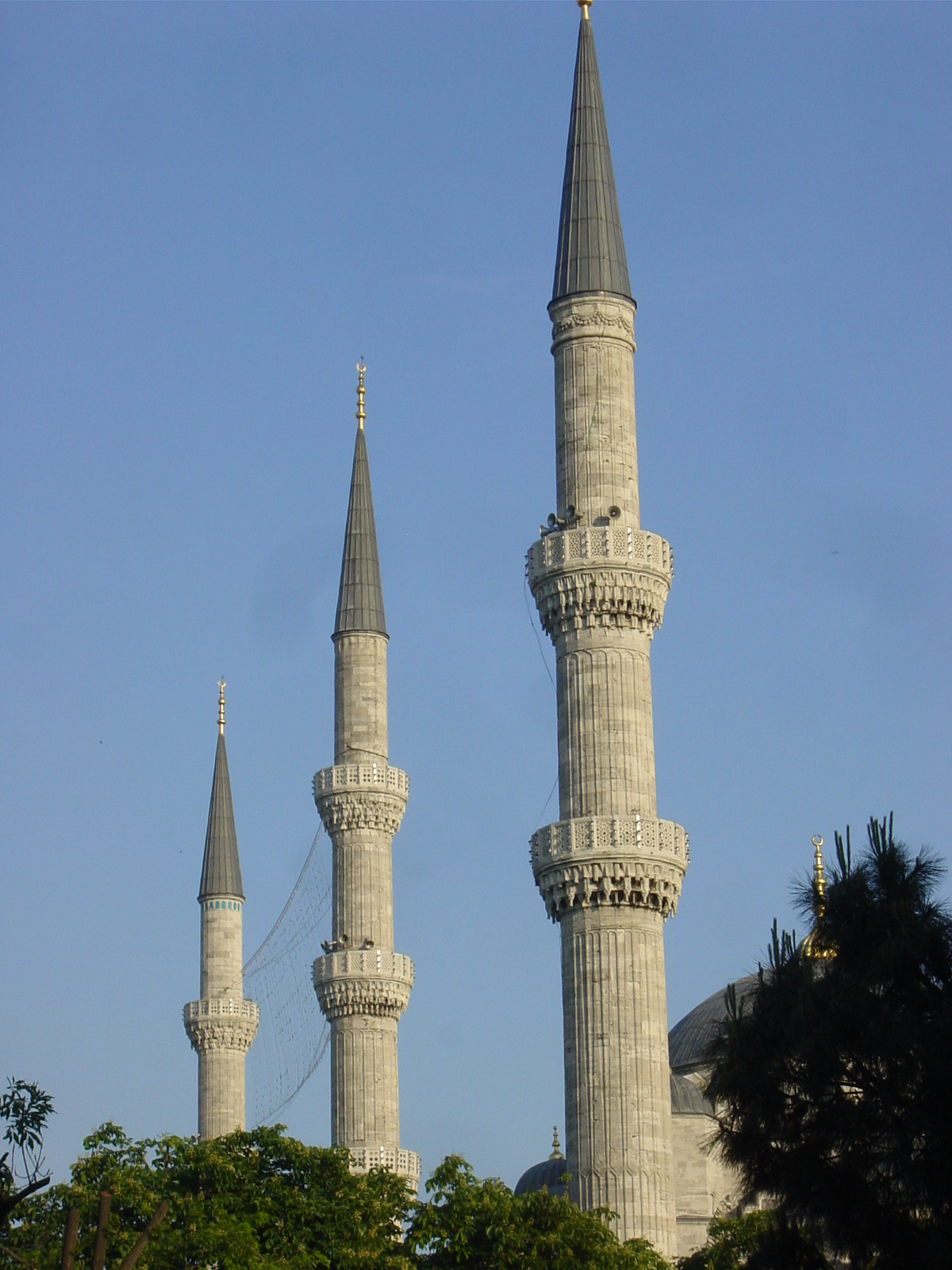
Ottoman minarets of the Sultan Ahmed Mosque in Istanbul (early 17th century)

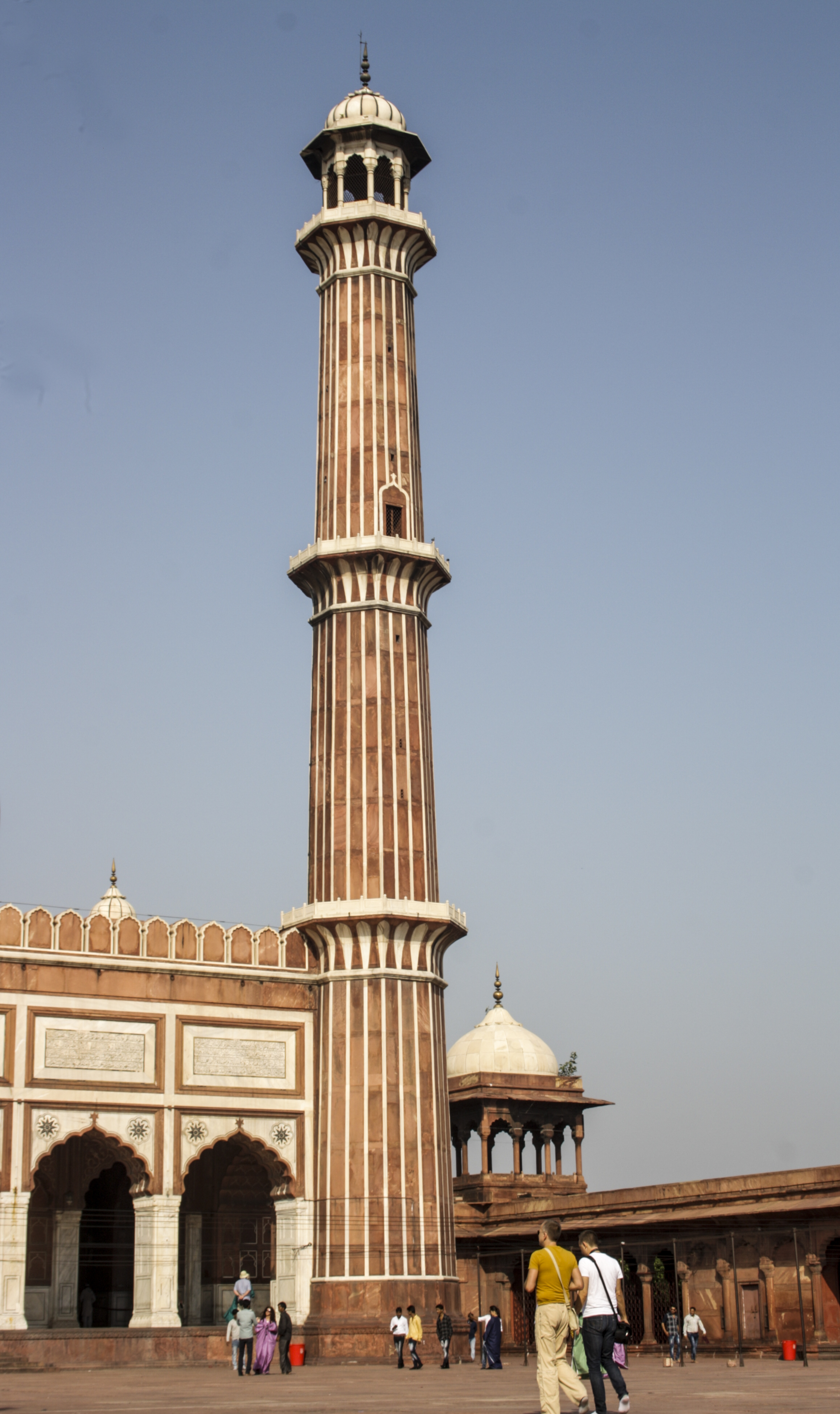
Minaret at the Jama Masjid in Delhi (mid-17th century)

== Towns and cities ==
=== Early Muslim garrison towns ===
In the newly conquered areas of the early Muslim expansion, military settlements were often founded, known individually as a misr (Arabic: مصر, pl. amṣār). This policy continued up to the Umayyad period. Like frontier colonies, these towns served as bases for further conquests. Initially, they appear to have been modest settlements consisting of an agglomeration of tents, perhaps similar to ancient Roman legionary camps. They were established outside existing non-Muslim cities. They were often unfortified and the residents were organized according to tribal origins. Rather than maintaining their original purpose to serve as a military base, many amṣār developed into urbanized administrative and commercial centers. In particular, this happened in the case of the Iraqi cities of Kufa and Basra (which became known as al-miṣrān, "the two forts"), as well as Fustat and Kairouan in North Africa. Basic facilities like a mosque, a governor's residence (dār al-imāra), and a market were likely the first major constructions to appear, located at the center of the town.

=== Transformation of conquered towns ===
More often than founding new cities, the new Islamic rulers took over existing towns. Most of the new Arab settlers nonetheless settled into previously existing urban centers throughout the conquered territories. These cities were transformed according to the needs of the new Islamic society and Islamic facilities were inserted into the existing urban fabric after the conquest. In the case of Damascus and Aleppo, for example, the cities were largely of Roman-Byzantine heritage and their topography changed slowly. The Islamic presence was signaled at first only by the presence of a mosque (and, in Damascus, the royal palace). This transformation, which resulted in what is often regarded as the traditional "Islamic" city, occurred over a long period and was shaped by multiple social and economic causes that varied according to region and period. The arrival of Islamic rule was only one stage in a process that had already begun by the 6th century.

The principle of arranging buildings is known as "horizontal spread". Residencies and public buildings as well as private housing tend to be laid out separately, and are not directly related to each other architectonically. Archaeological excavations at the city of Jerash, the Gerasa of Antiquity, have revealed how the Umayyads have transformed the city plan.

=== Experiments with ideal city models ===
The antique concept of the architecture of a metropolis is based on a structure of main and smaller roads running through the entire city, and dividing it into quarters. The streets are oriented towards public buildings like a palace, temple, or a public square. Two main roads, (cardo and decumanus) cross each other at right angles in the center of the city. A few cities were founded during the early Islamic Umayyad Caliphate, the outlines of which were based on the Ancient Roman concept of the ideal city. An example of a city planned according to such concepts was excavated at Anjar in Lebanon. Donald Whitcomb argues that the early Muslim conquests initiated a conscious attempt to recreate specific morphological features characteristic of earlier western and southwestern Arabian cities.

The Arab elite of the early Islam were city dwellers of Mecca, Medina, Ta'if and the highly urbanized society of Yemen whose Arabian traditions contributed to the urban development of the early Islamic cities. Outside Arabia, the early military encampments of Kufa, Basra, Fustat, and Kairouan were rapidly transformed into permanent foundations and planned cities. One of the traditions contributing to the early Islamic city was the south Arabian city, such as Sana'a, to which type Mecca and Fustat belonged. Two urban types based on social organization have been proposed by Walter Dostal. The first is called the San'a-formation, developed from a market center and inhabited by groups of the same tribe with social differentiation based on his "farmer-craftsman" technological specializations. The second urban type is the Tarim-formation, in which quarter organization reflects the social structure of a multi-tribal settlement.

=== Urban morphology ===
The architecture of the "oriental" Islamic town is based on cultural and sociological concepts which differ from those of European cities. In both cultures, a distinction is made between the areas used by the rulers and their government and administration, public places of everyday common life, and the areas of private life. While the structures and concepts of European towns originated from a sociological struggle to gain basic rights of freedom—or town privileges—from political or religious authorities during the Middle Ages, an Islamic town or city is fundamentally influenced by the preservation of the unity of secular and religious life throughout time.

In a Muslim city, palaces and residences as well as public places like charitable or religious complexes (mosques, madrasas, and hospitals) and private living spaces rather coexist alongside each other. The buildings tend to be more inwardly oriented, and are separated from the surrounding "outside" either by walls or by the hierarchical ordering of the streets, or both. Streets tend to lead from public main roads to cul-de-sac byroads and onwards into more private plots, and then end there. There are no, or very few, internal connections between different quarters of the city. In order to move from one quarter to the next, one has to go back to the main road again.

Within a city quarter, byroads lead towards individual building complexes or clusters of houses. The individual house is frequently also oriented towards an inner atrium, and enclosed by walls, which mostly are unadorned, unlike European outward-oriented, representative façades. Thus, the spatial structure of a Muslim city essentially reflects the ancient nomadic tradition of living in a family group or tribe, held together by asabiyyah ("bond of cohesion", or "family loyalty"), strictly separated from the "outside". In general, the morphology of an Islamic city is granting—or denying—access according to the basic concept of hierarchical degrees of privacy. The inhabitants move from public space to the living quarters of their tribe, and onwards to their family home. Within a family house, there are again to be found common and separate spaces, the latter, and most private, usually reserved for women and children. In the end, only the family heads have free and unlimited access to all rooms and areas of their private home, as opposed to the more European concept of interconnecting different spaces for free and easy access. The hierarchy of privacy thus guides and structures the entire social life in a city, from the ruler to the commoner, from the town to the house.

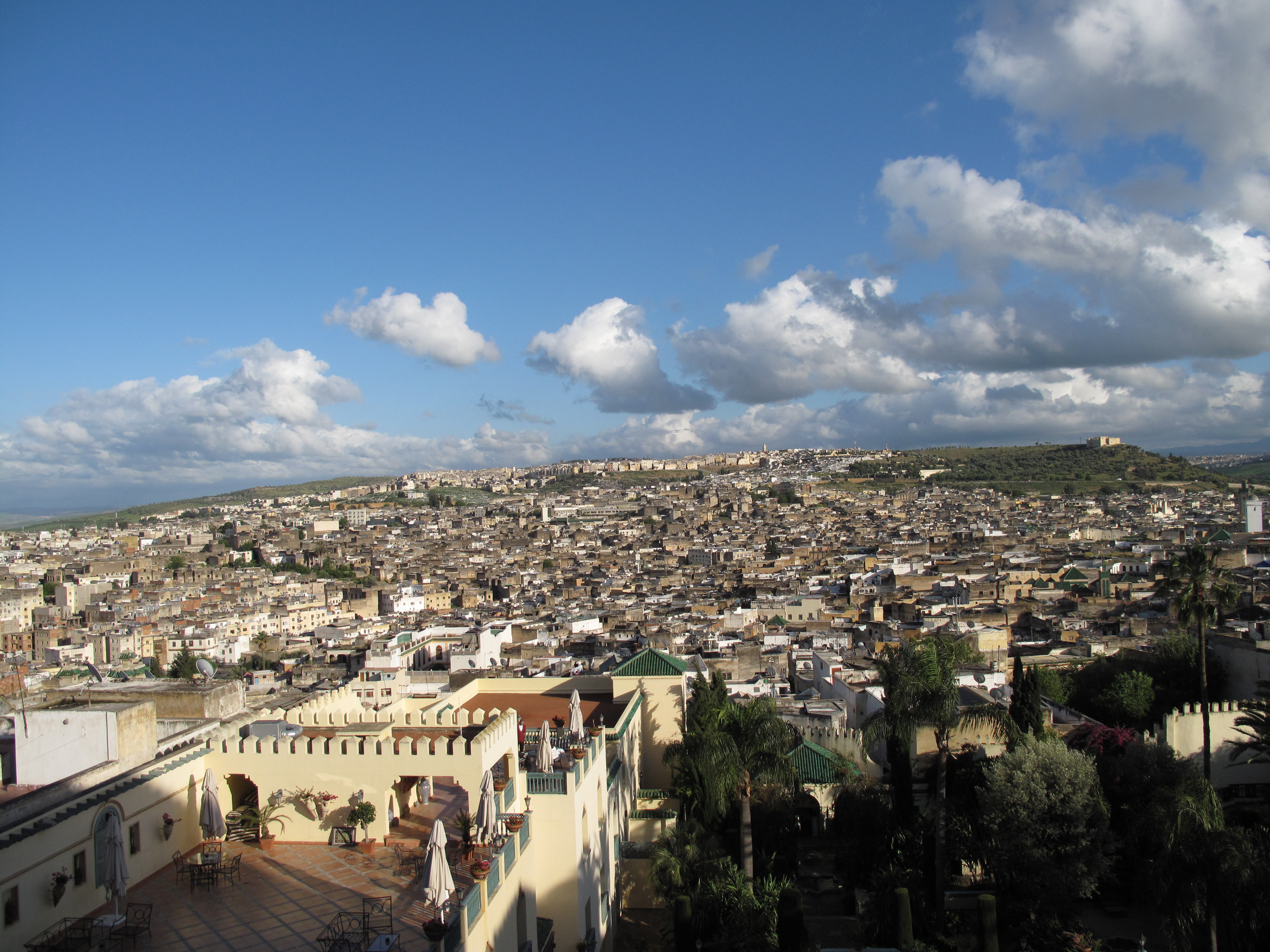
Medina quarter of Fez, Morocco

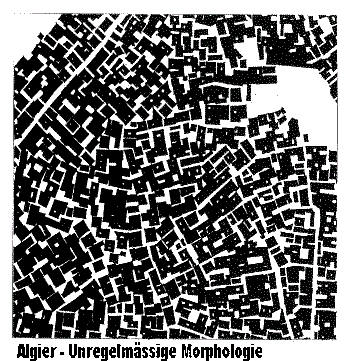
Figure-ground diagram of Algiers

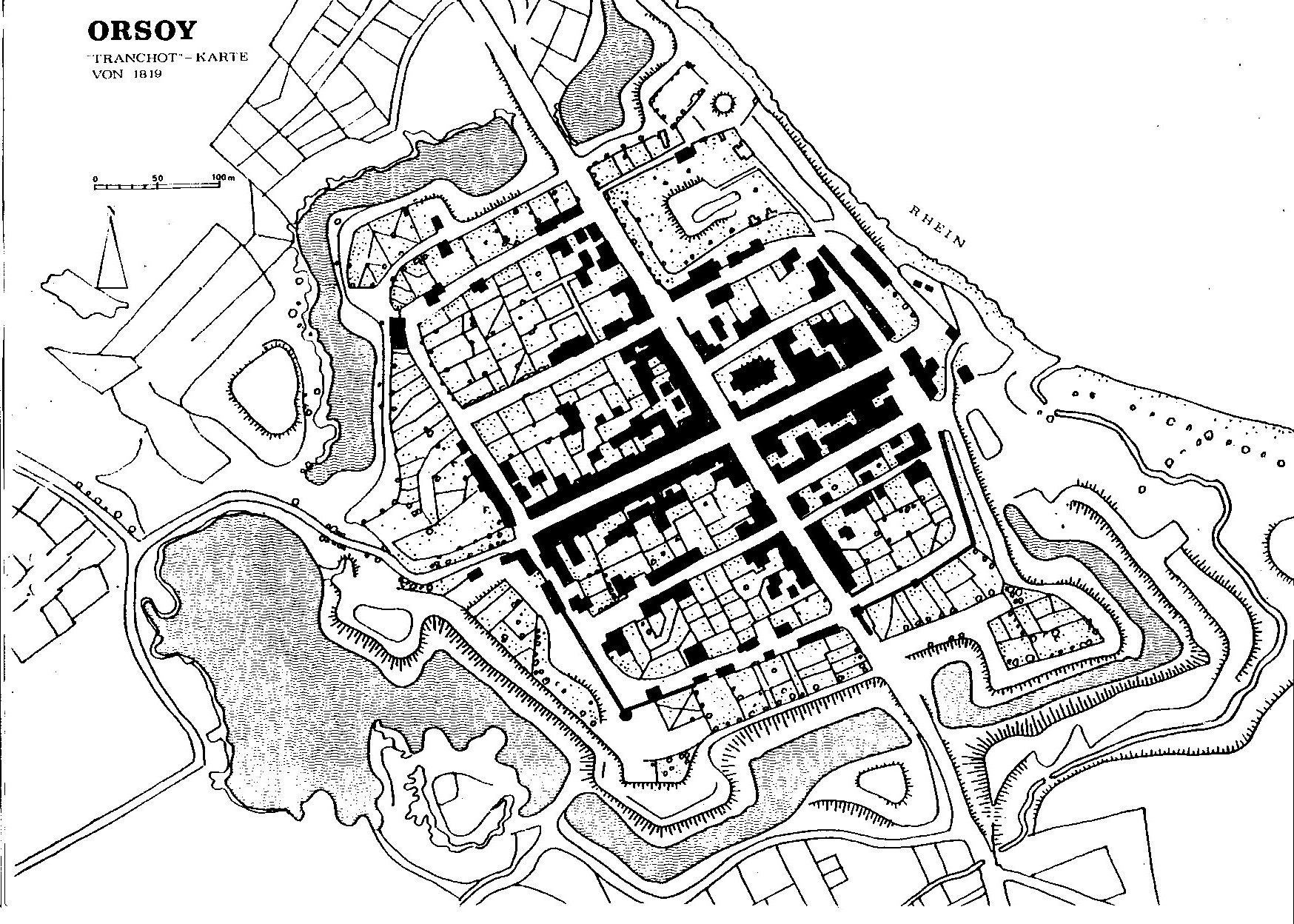
Figure-ground diagram of a European town (1819)

== Influences ==
=== Greco-Roman and Sasanian influences ===
Early Islamic architecture was influenced by two different ancient traditions:

1. Greco-Roman tradition: In particular, the regions of the newly conquered Byzantine Empire (Southwestern Anatolia, Syria, Egypt and the Maghreb) supplied architects, masons, mosaicists and other craftsmen to the new Islamic rulers. These artisans were trained in Byzantine architecture and decorative arts, and continued building and decorating in Byzantine style, which had developed out of Hellenistic and ancient Roman architecture.
2. Eastern tradition: Mesopotamia and Persia, despite adopting elements of Hellenistic and Roman representative style, retained their independent architectural traditions, which derived from Sasanian architecture and its predecessors.

The transition process between late antiquity, or post-classical, and Islamic architecture is exemplified by archaeologic findings in North Syria and Palestine, the Bilad al-Sham (Levant region) of the Umayyad and Abbasid Caliphates. In this region, late antique, or Christian, architectural traditions merged with the pre-Islamic Arabian heritage of the conquerors.

=== Arabian ===
References on Islamic architecture generally agree that pre-Islamic architecture in the Arabian Peninsula had only limited influence on the development of Islamic architecture, at least by comparison with the influences of existing architectural traditions in the conquered territories beyond the peninsula. In western scholarship, a traditional assumption was that the Arabs of the early 7th century, at the time of Muhammad, were nomadic pastoralists who did not have strong architectural traditions. Thanks to more recent studies and archeological investigations, this view has since been revised and is now considered obsolete. According to scholar Beatrice Saint Laurent, early academic investigations into the history of Islamic monumental architecture led to the "flawed view that saw the roots of an Early Islamic monumental architecture and art solely in the traditions of the conquered regions". Scholars now agree that a rich architectural tradition also preceded the appearance of Islam in Arabia and the first Islamic monuments.

The major architectural contribution that took place in Arabia during the early Islamic period was the development of a distinctive Muslim mosque. The hypostyle mosque constructed by Muhammad in Medina served as a model for early mosque design throughout the Islamic world. Umayyad religious architecture was the earliest expression of Islamic art on a grand scale and the Umayyad Mosque of Damascus reproduced the hypostyle model at a monumental scale. Moreover, the Umayyads did not come from a cultural void and were aware of their own Arabian cultural history. Some scholars suggest they sought to continue the pre-Islamic Arabian architectural tradition of building tall palaces to symbolize the ruler's power.

== Regional styles (after the 10th century) ==
=== Iran and Central Asia ===
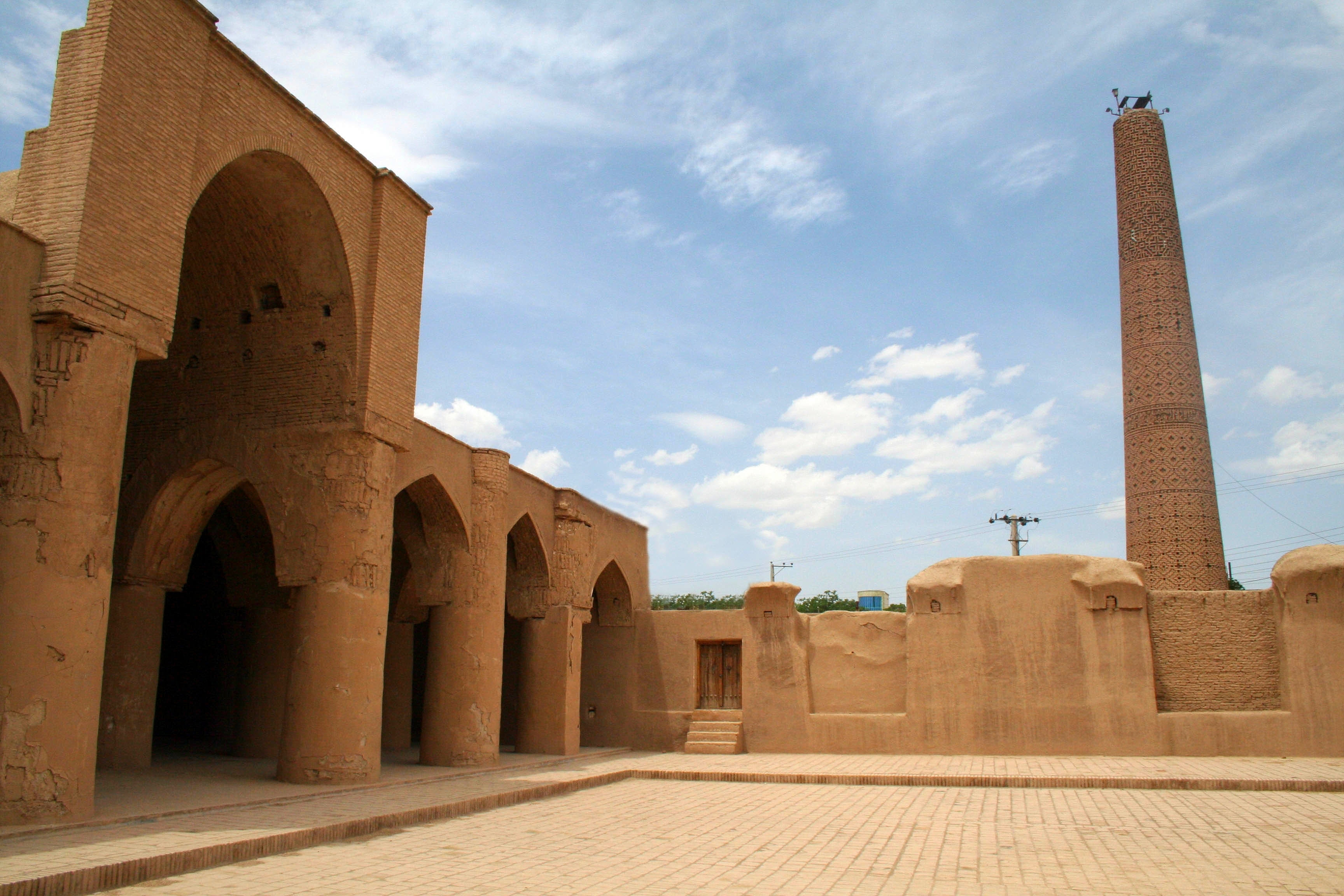
Tarikhaneh Mosque, one of the oldest preserved mosques in Iran

Starting in the 10th century and especially during the period of Seljuk domination, the eastern Islamic world – including Iran and Central Asia – generally shared a common architectural style. This style was characterized by the prominent use of brick as both construction material and decoration, extensive arcades, glazed tile decoration on the outside of buildings, the privileged use of domes and vaulting, and the increasing use of muqarnas.

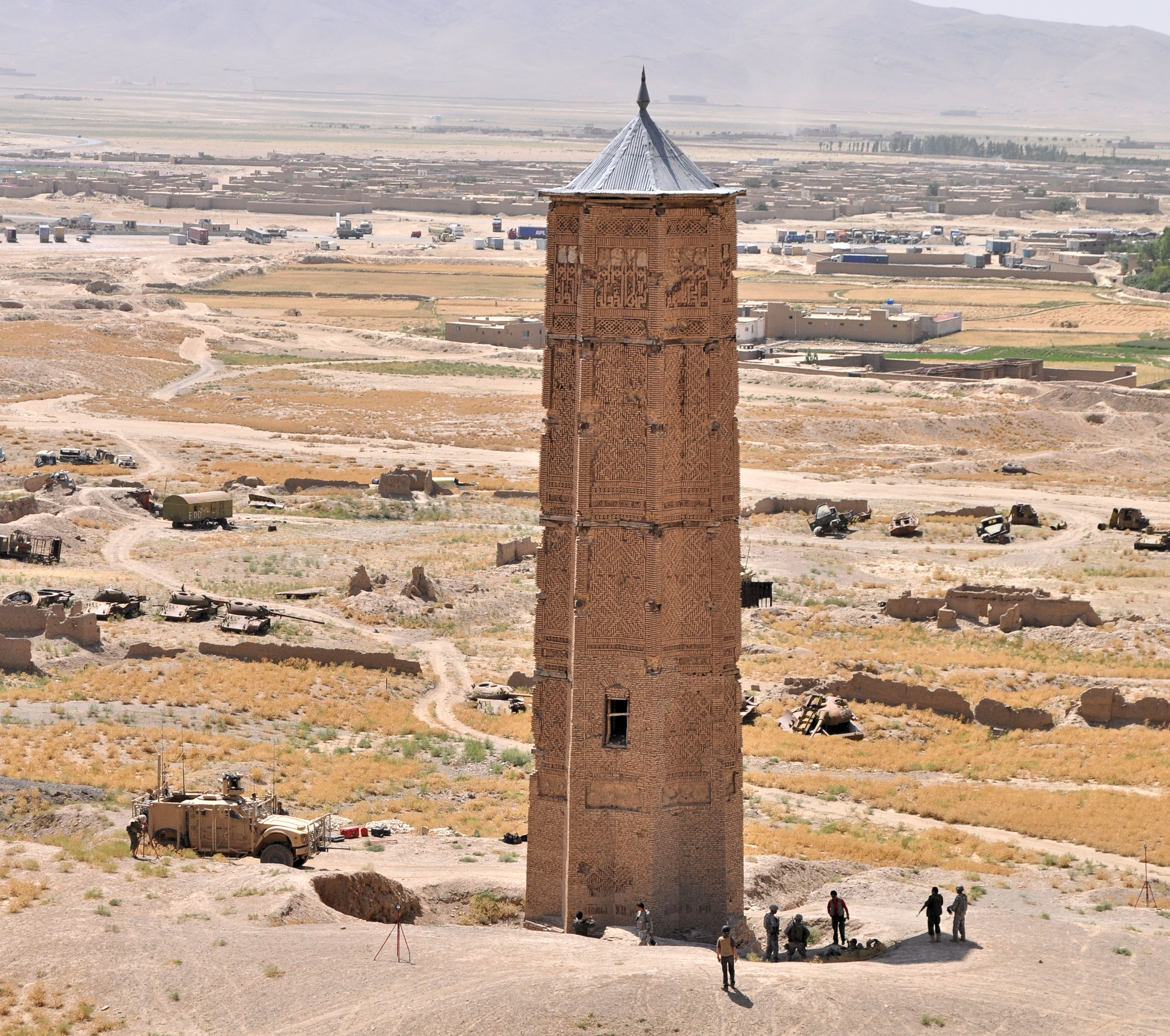
Ghaznavid Tower of Mas'ud III near Ghazni (in present-day Afghanistan), from the early 12th century

Turkic peoples began moving into the Middle East from the 8th century onward and, after converting to Islam, became major political and military forces in the region. The first major Turkic dynasty was the Ghaznavids, who ruled from Ghazna in present-day Afghanistan and adopted a Persianate culture. In the second half of the 12th century the Ghurids, of uncertain ethnic origin, replaced them as the major power in the region from northern India to the edge of the Caspian Sea. Among the most remarkable monuments of these two dynasties are a number of ornate brick towers and minarets that have survived as stand-alone structures and whose exact functions are unclear. They include the Tower of Mas'ud III near Ghazna (early 12th century) and the Minaret of Jam built by the Ghurids (late 12th century). Around the same time, between the late 10th century and the early 13th century, the Turkic Qarakhanids ruled in Transoxiana. This period is regarded as a "classical" age of Central Asian architecture, with many constructions taking place in Bukhara and Samarkand.

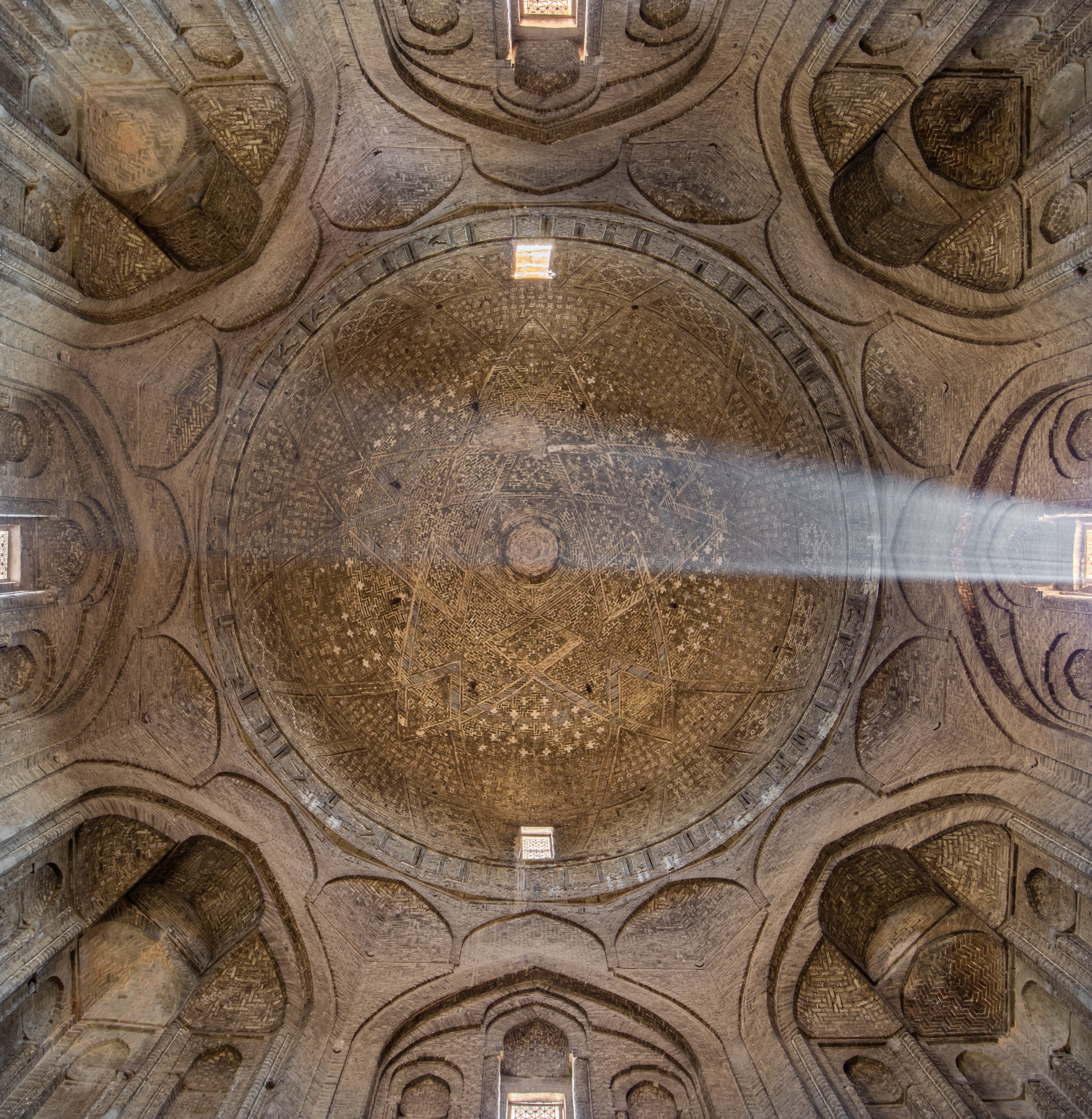
Dome in the Jameh Mosque of Isfahan, Iran, added in 1088–89 by Seljuk vizier Taj al-Mulk

More significant was the arrival of the Seljuk Turks and the formation of the Great Seljuk Empire in the 11th century, which conquered all of Iran and other extensive territories in Central Asia and the Middle East. The most important religious monument from the Great Seljuk period is the Jameh Mosque of Isfahan, which was expanded and modified by various Seljuk patrons in the late 11th century and early 12th century. Two major and innovative domed chambers were added to it in the late 11th century. Four large iwans were then erected around the courtyard around the early 12th century, giving rise to the four-iwan plan. The four-iwan plan revolutionised the form and function of the mosques in the region and introduced new types of buildings involving madrasas and caravanserais which spread through Iran, Anatolia, and Syria.

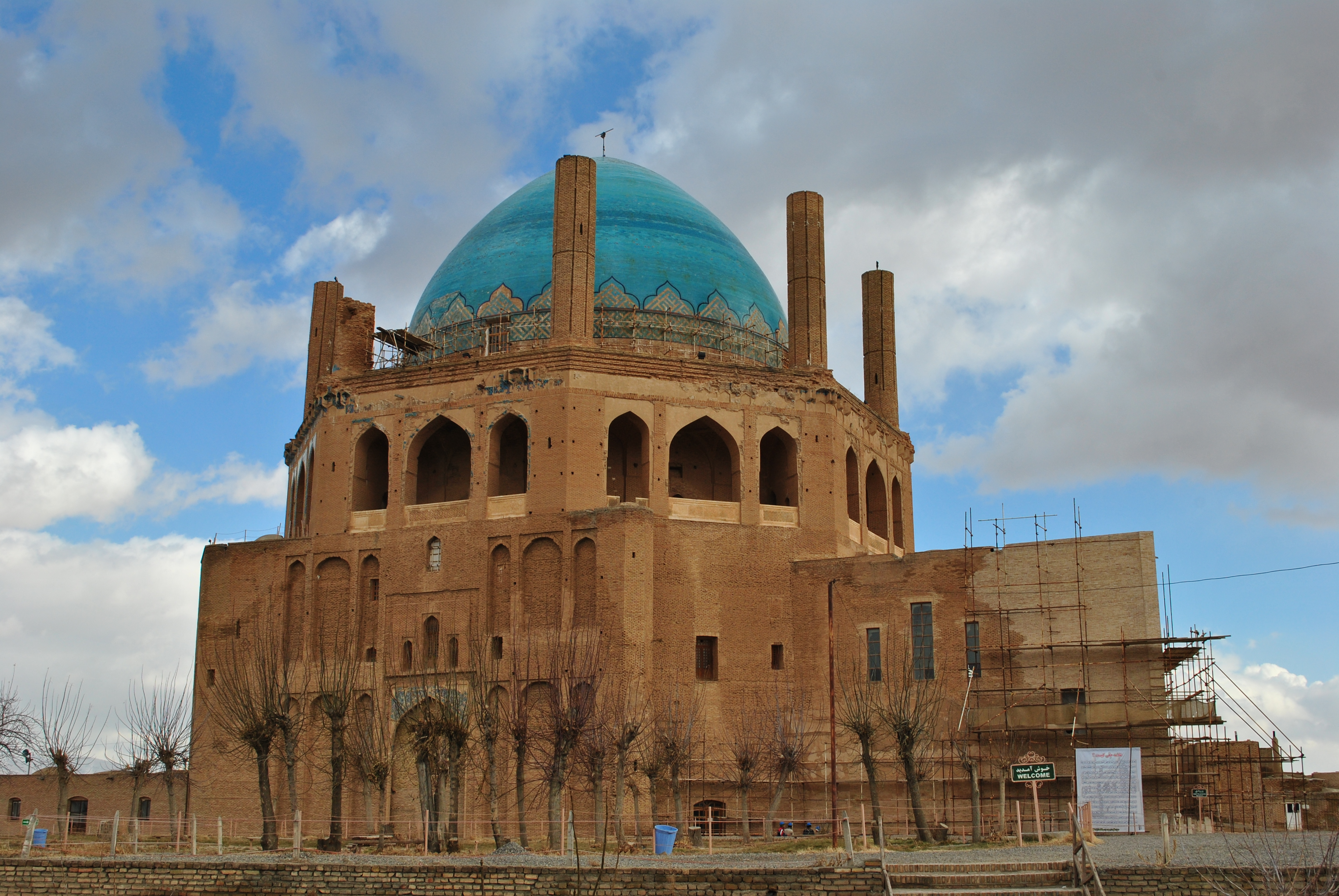
Mausoleum of Uljaytu at Soltaniyeh (early 14th century)

Iran and Central Asia were conquered by the Mongols in the 13th century, which led to the establishment of the Ilkhanate. The Ilkhanate period provided several innovations to the design of domed structures and advancements in techniques of tile decoration. The pinnacle of Ilkhanid architecture was the construction of Uljaytu's mausoleum in Soltaniyeh, Iran, which features a multi-level octagonal structure topped by a massive dome. The dome measures almost 25 metres (82 ft) in diameter and about 50 metres (160 ft) high, making it the largest dome in historical Iranian architecture and the largest domed space at the time of its construction. Its thin, double-shelled construction was reinforced by arches between the layers. The addition of an external vaulted gallery wrapping around the upper part of the building was a feature that would be further developed in later periods and ultimately be perfected in the Taj Mahal.

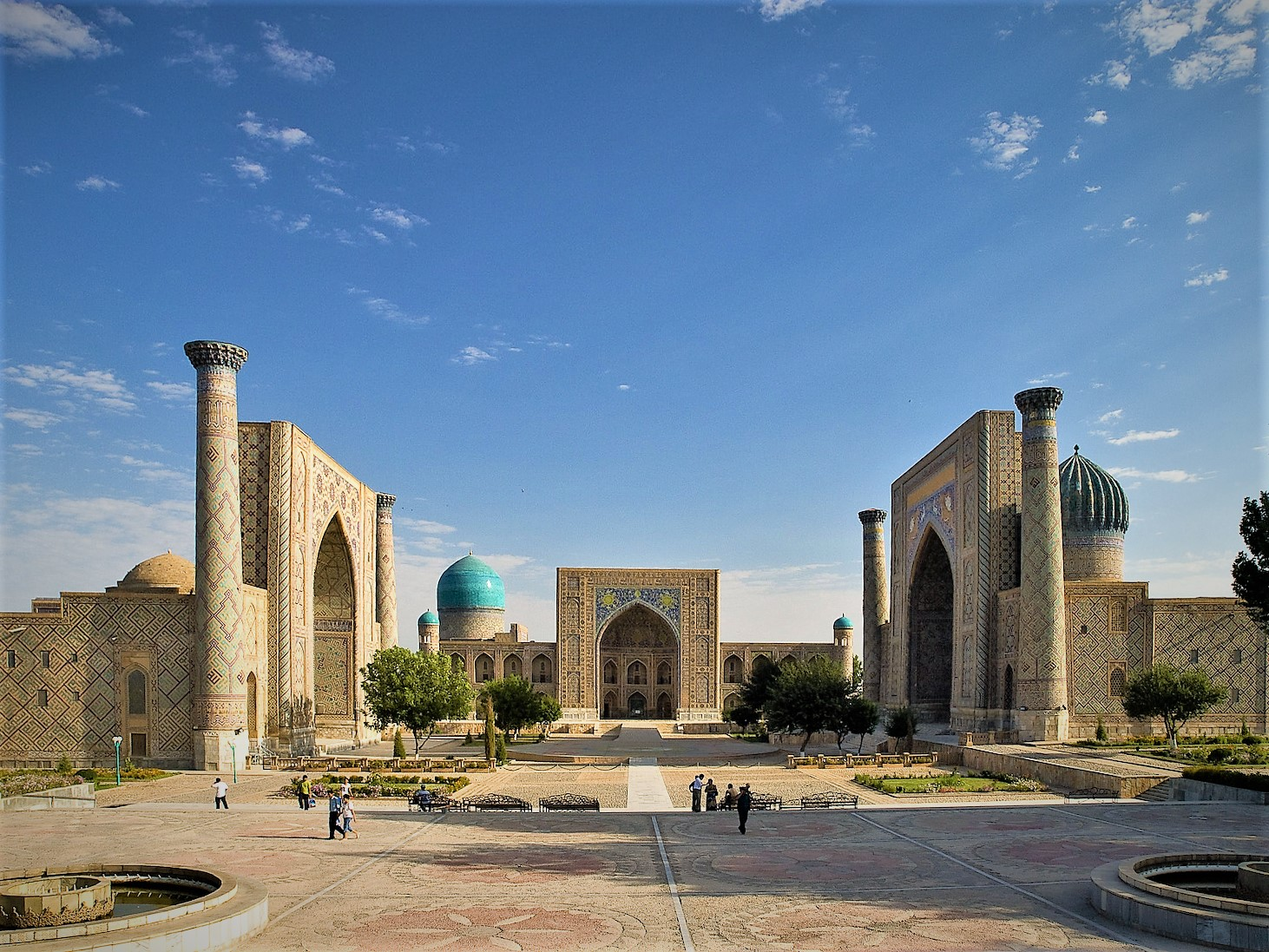
The Registan is an ensemble of three madrasas in Samarkand, Uzbekistan. The Ulugh Beg Madrasa (left) dates from the Timurid period (15th century).

Iranian architecture and city planning also reached an apogee under the Timurids, the dynasty founded by Timur (r. 1370–1405). Timurid architecture is marked by its grand scale, prominent double-shelled domes, extensive use of ceramic tiles on the outside, and elaborate geometric vaulting on the inside. It drew on the previous developments of Ilkhanid architecture and refined them, developing an imperial style that was influential beyond its original borders, such as in the early Ottoman Empire to the west and the Mughal Empire on the Indian subcontinent. The monuments erected by Timur and his successors are found across the region but concentrated especially in Samarkand and Herat, the main capitals.

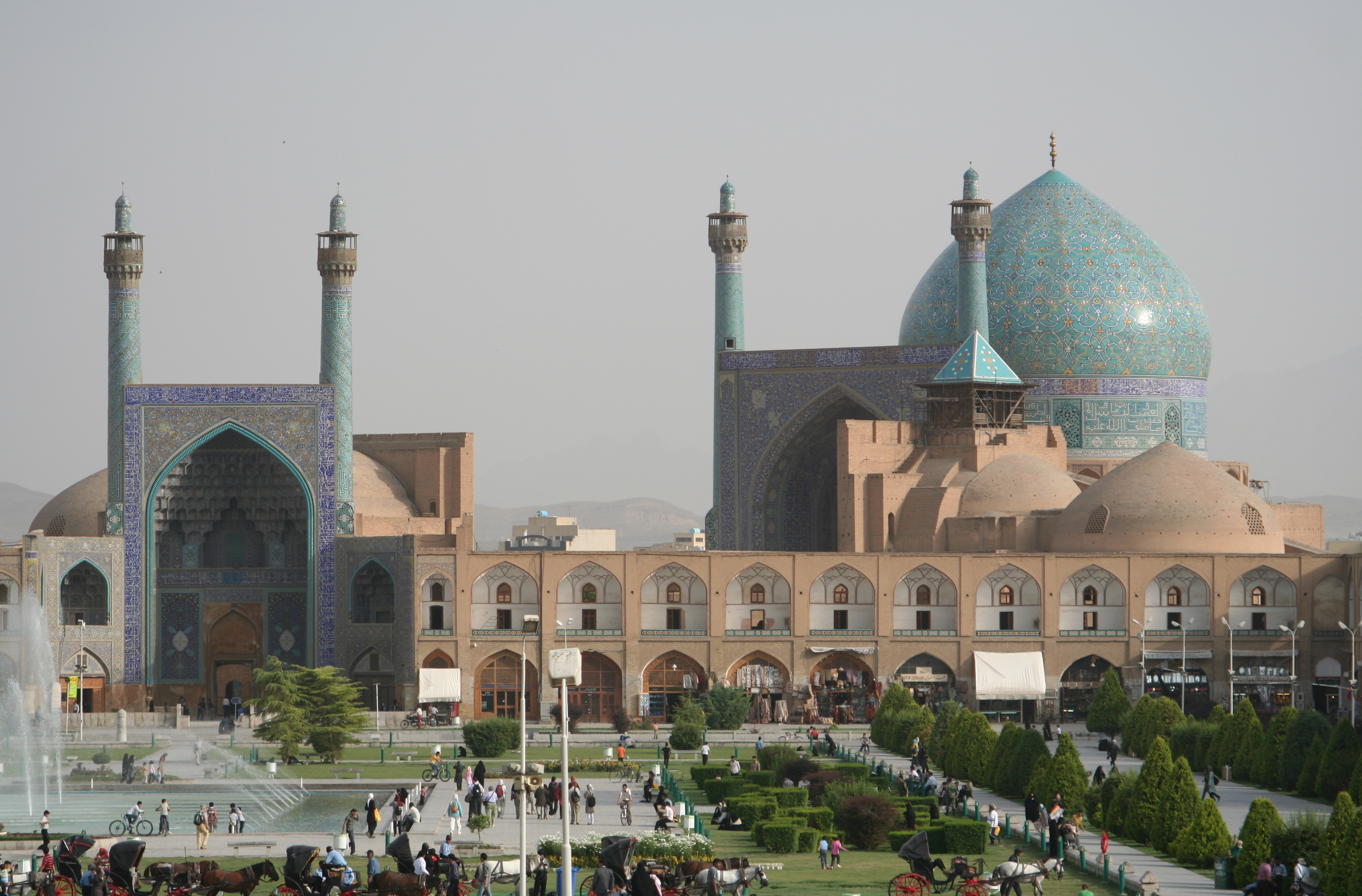
Shah Mosque at Naqsh-e Jahan Square, in Isfahan, Iran, built by Abbas I during the Safavid period

The renaissance in Persian mosque and dome building came during the Safavid dynasty, when Shah Abbas, in 1598 initiated the reconstruction of Isfahan, with the Naqsh-e Jahan Square as the centerpiece of his new capital. The distinct feature of Persian domes, which separates them from those domes created in the Christian world or the Ottoman and Mughal empires, was the colorful tiles, with which they covered the exterior of their domes, as they would on the interior. These domes soon numbered dozens in Isfahan, and the distinct, blue-colored shape came to dominate the skyline of the city. This distinct style of architecture was perfected during the Safavid period, which saw the advent of the haft-rang, or seven-colour style of tile burning, a process that enabled them to apply more colours to each tile, creating richer patterns, sweeter to the eye. The colours that the Persians favoured were golden, white and turquoise patterns on a dark- blue background. The extensive inscription bands of calligraphy and arabesque on most of the major buildings where carefully planned and executed by Ali Reza Abbasi, who was appointed head of the royal library and Master calligrapher at the Shah's court in 1598, while Shaykh Bahai oversaw the construction projects. Reaching 53 meters in height, the dome of the Shah Mosque would become the tallest in the city when it was finished in 1629. It was built as a double-shelled dome, with 14 m spanning between the two layers, and resting on an octagonal dome chamber.

=== Post-Seljuk Syria and Mesopotamia ===
As the Seljuk Empire began to break up in the 12th century, various Seljuk elites established autonomous local dynasties throughout the Middle East, particularly in the western half of the empire, which included Iraq and Syria. Under Zengid and Artuqid rule, cities like Mosul, Diyarbakir, Hasankeyf, and Mardin in Upper Mesopotamia (or al-Jazira in Arabic) became important centers of architectural development that had a long-term influence in the wider region. One of the most notable monuments is the Great Mosque of Diyarbakir, founded in the 7th century but rebuilt under the Seljuks and the Artuqids in the 12th century. It is similar in form to the Umayyad Mosque of Damascus and has ornate Classical-like elements on its courtyard façade. The city walls of Diyarbakir also feature several towers built by the Artuqids and decorated with a mix of calligraphic inscriptions and figurative images of animals and mythological creatures carved in stone. One of the culminations of later Artuqid architecture is the Zinciriye or Sultan Isa Madrasa in Mardin, dating from 1385. In Mosul, the Zengid ruler Nur al-Din Zengi built the al-Nuri Mosque (1148 and 1170–1172), of which only the original minaret was preserved up to modern times. (The minaret and the rebuilt mosque were recently destroyed in the Battle of Mosul.)

Zengid rule helped to spread architectural forms from the eastern Islamic world to the region of Syria. Damascus regained some prominence after it came under Nur al-Din's control in 1154. That same year, Nur al-Din founded a hospital complex, the Maristan al-Nuri or Bimaristan of Nur al-Din, which was highly influential in the Islamic world and is notable for the muqarnas vaulting of its entrance portal and a muqarnas dome of Mesopotamian influence over the vestibule. The Zengids and their successors, the Kurdish Ayyubid dynasty, built many more madrasas, hammams, and other charitable buildings in the cities of Syria. Unlike Seljuk and Iranian madrasas, the Syrian madrasas are smaller and more diverse in their layouts, adapted to the dense urban fabric of cities like Damascus and Aleppo (e.g. Adiliya Madrasa in Damascus and Firdaws Madrasa in Aleppo).

The Ayyubids also built or refortified numerous castles and urban citadels in Egypt and the Syrian region, including the Cairo Citadel, Aleppo Citadel, Damascus Citadel, Ajloun Castle, Qal'at Najm, Qal'at al-Jindi, and others. Motivated in part by advances in siege warfare, military architecture evolved significantly during this period. Defensive towers and curtain walls became taller, more massive, and accommodated a greater array of chambers, platforms, or machicolations from which projectiles could be shot at the enemy. The defensive systems of gates became more sophisticated and bent entrances became common. Some fortifications also show greater attention to aesthetic considerations, perhaps due to their role as displays of the ruler's power.

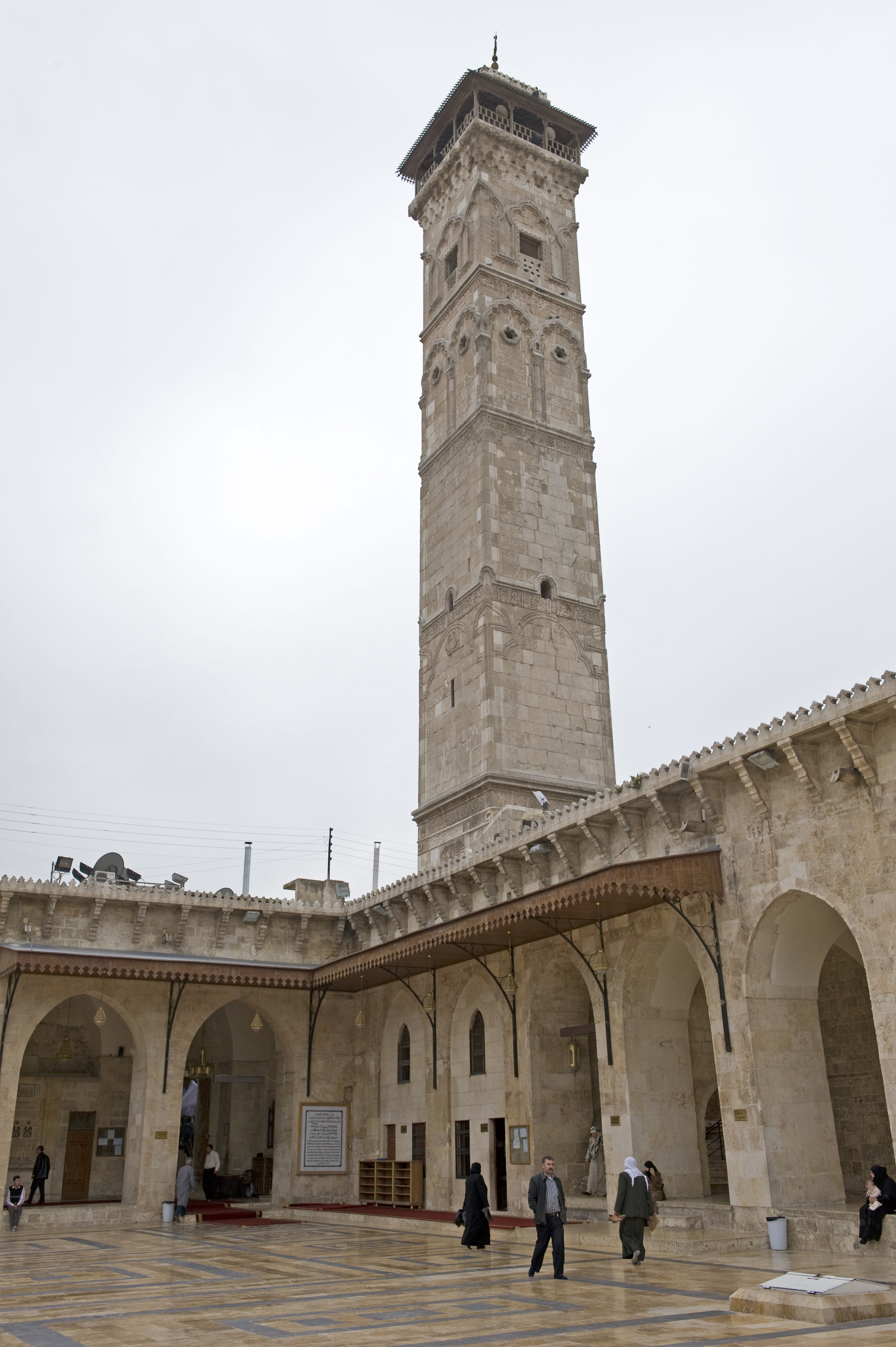
The minaret of the Great Mosque of Aleppo (prior to its destruction in 2013), built circa 1090 during the Great Seljuk period

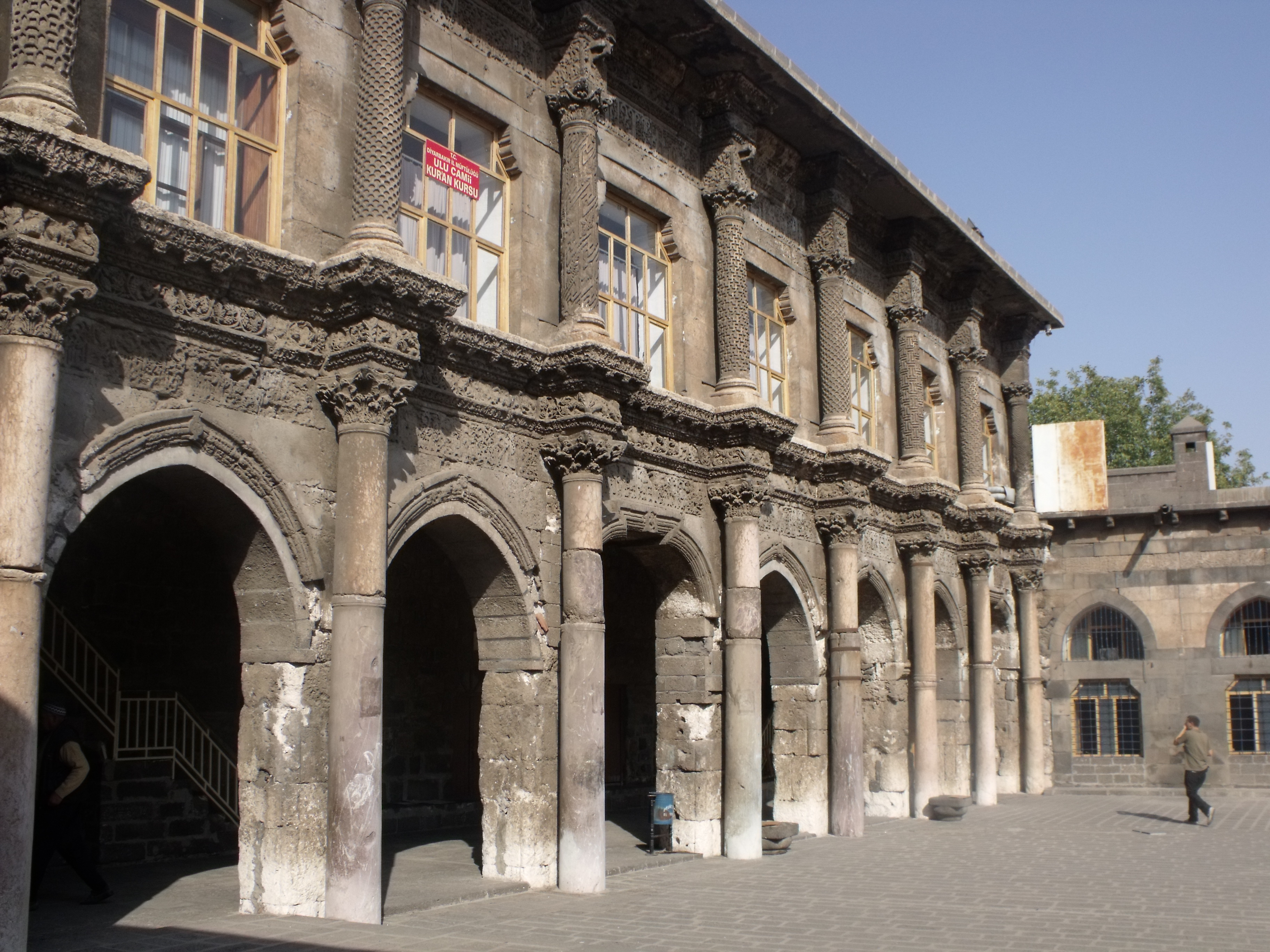
Courtyard façade of the Great Mosque of Diyarbakir, founded in the 7th century and rebuilt by the Seljuks and Artuqids in the 11th–12th centuries

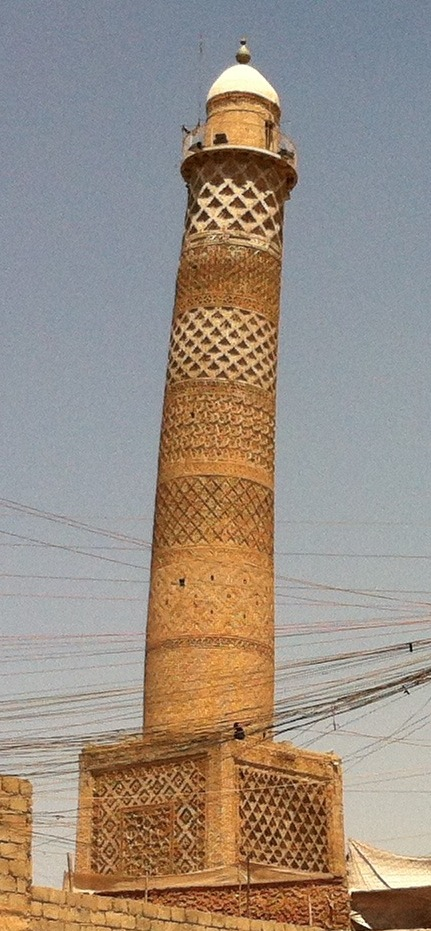
Minaret of the al-Nuri Mosque in Mosul (before its destruction in 2017), dating from the 12th century

Portal of the Hospital of Nur al-Din in Damascus (1154)

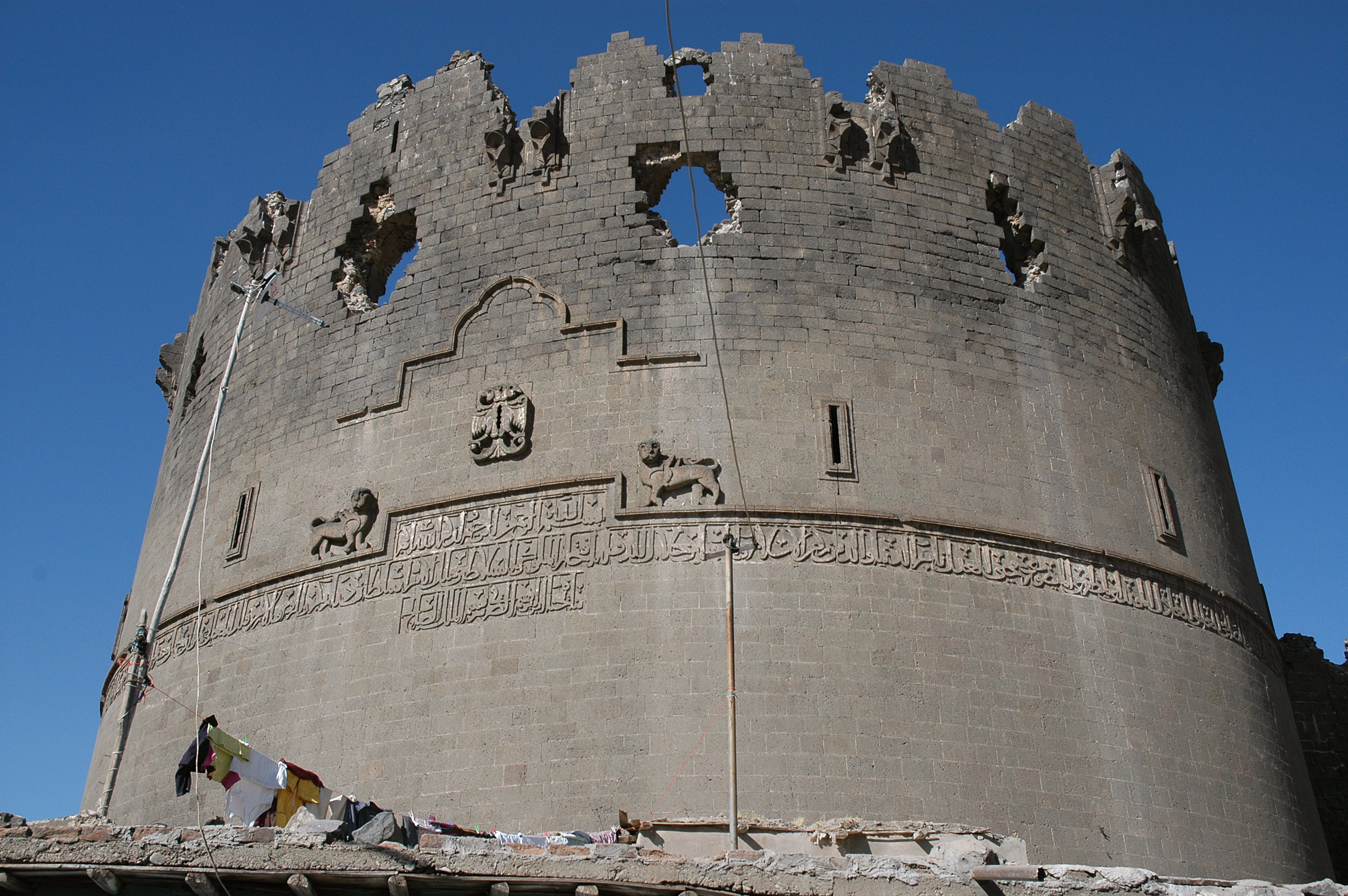
Yedi Kardeş Tower in the city walls of Diyarbakir, built by Artuqid sultan Nasir al-Din Mahmud in 1208–1209

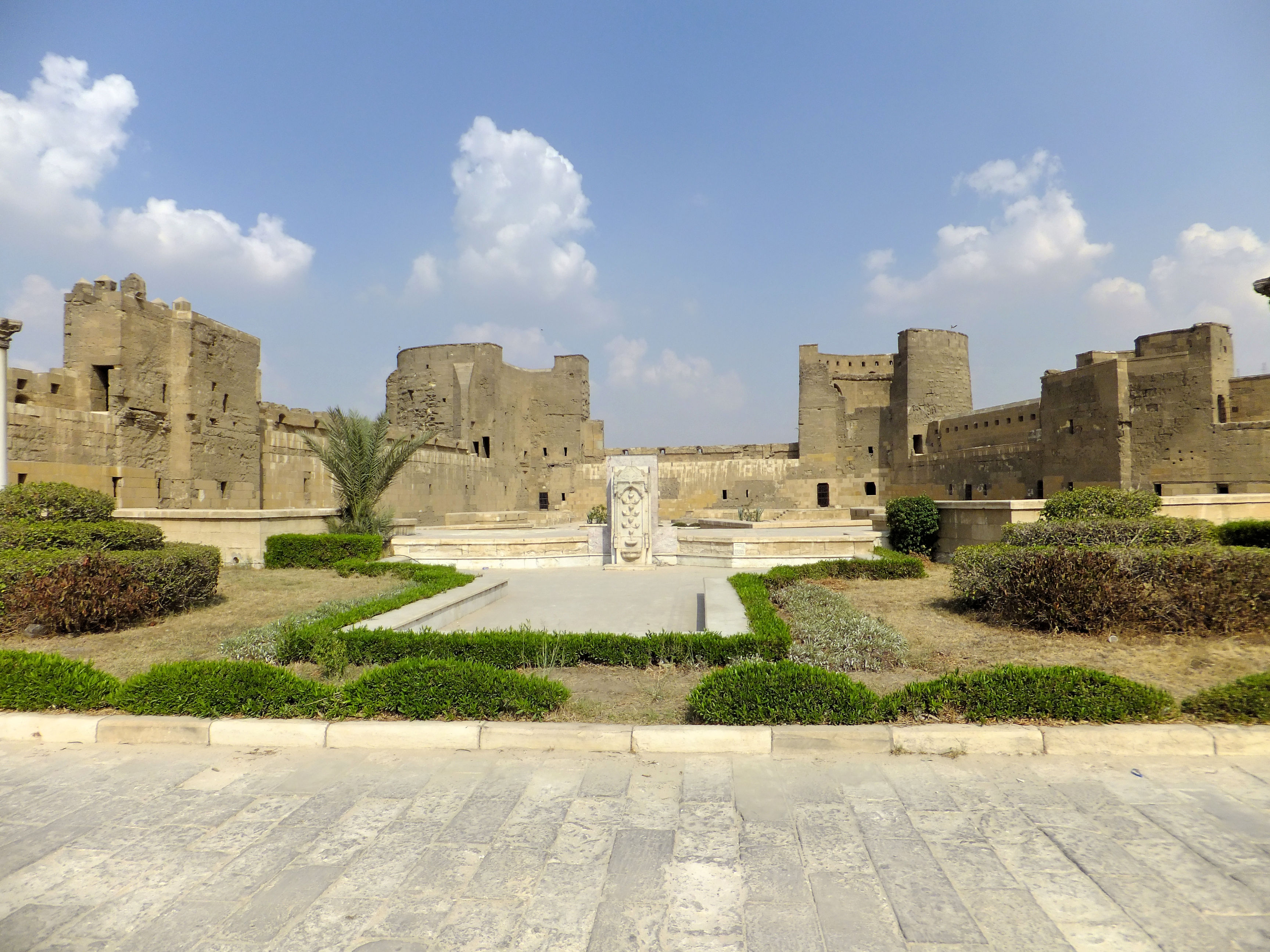
Northern section of the Cairo Citadel, whose walls still largely date from the Ayyubid period (late 12th and early 13th centuries)

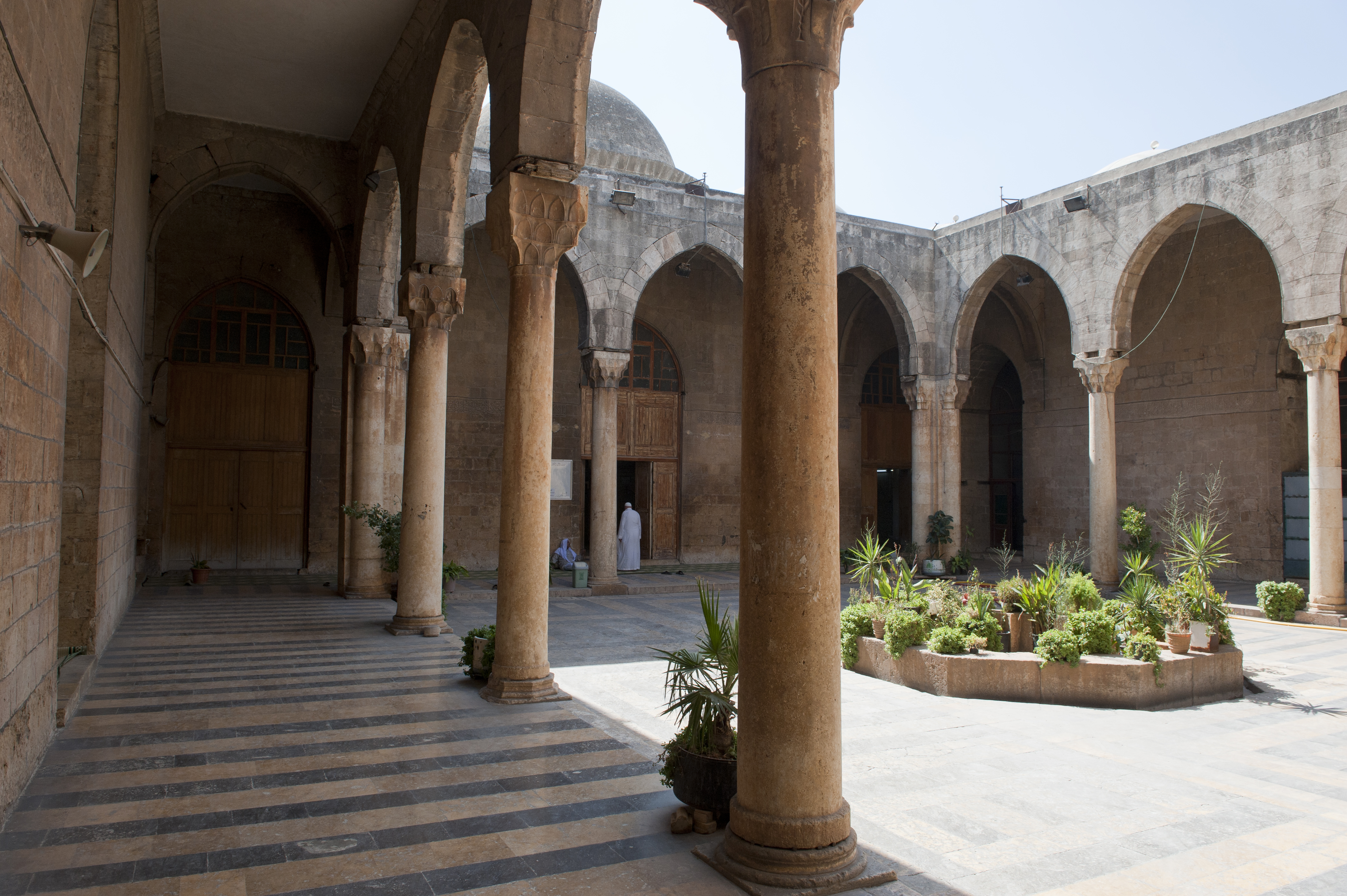
Firdaws Madrasa in Aleppo (1236), built under the Ayyubids

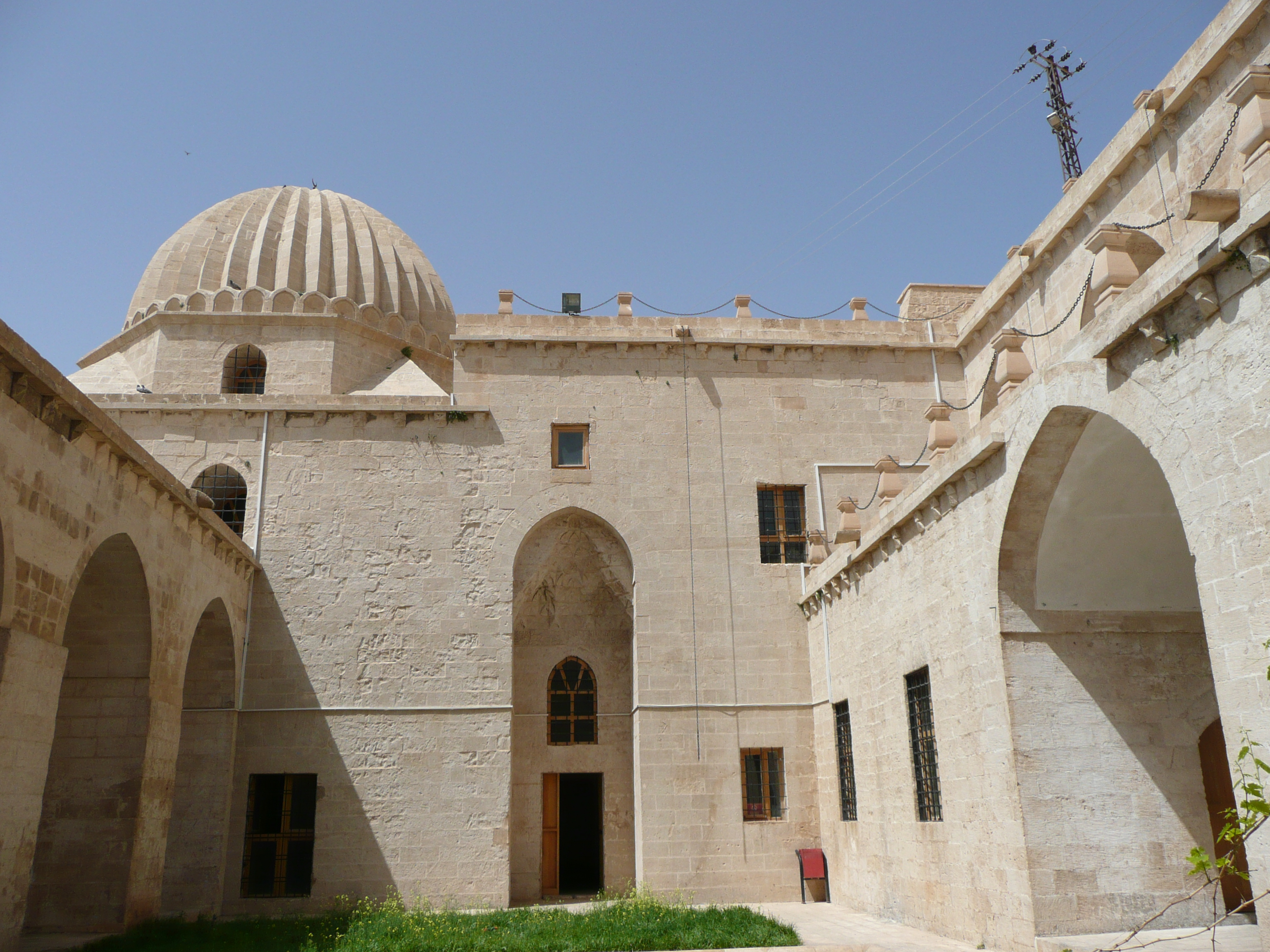
Zinciriye or Sultan Isa Madrasa in Mardin (1385), built by the Artuqids

=== Anatolian Seljuks and Beyliks ===
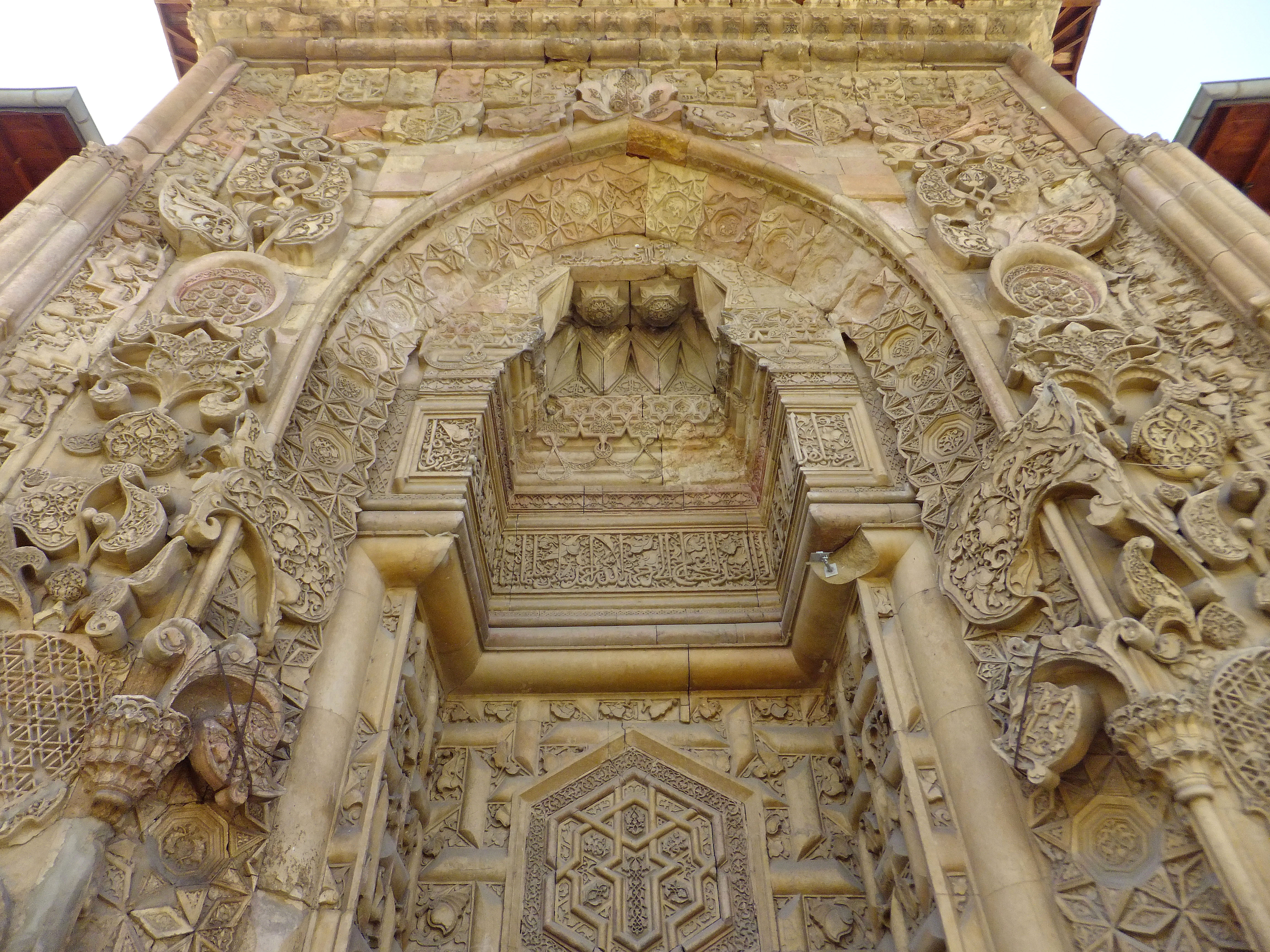
Portal of the Great Mosque of Divriği (1228–1229)

The Anatolian Seljuks ruled a territory that was multi-ethnic and only newly settled by Muslims. As a result, their architecture was eclectic and incorporated influences from other cultures such as Iranian, Armenian, and local Byzantine architecture. In contrast with Seljuk constructions further east, Anatolian architecture was largely built of stone. The golden age of their Anatolian empire, with its capital at Konya, was in the early 13th century. Seljuk authority declined after their defeat by the Mongols in 1243. The Mongol Ilkhanids then ruled eastern Anatolia indirectly through Seljuk vassals until 1308, when they took direct control. Smaller principalities and local emirates, known collectively as the Beyliks, progressively emerged. Despite this decline, the Seljuk tradition of architecture largely persisted and continued to evolve under these new rulers.

Decoration in Anatolian Seljuk architecture was concentrated on entrance portals, windows, and mihrabs. Stone-carving was one of the most accomplished techniques, with motifs ranging from earlier Iranian stucco motifs to local Byzantine and Armenian motifs. The madrasas of Sivas and the Ince Minareli Medrese (c. 1265) in Konya are among the most notable examples, while the Great Mosque and Hospital complex of Divriği is distinguished by some of the most eclectic and extravagant stone-carving in the region. Syrian-style ablaq striped marble also appears on some entrance portals in Konya. Anatolian architecture innovated further in the use of tile revetments to cover entire surfaces independently of other forms of decoration, as seen in the Karatay Medrese (1251–1252) in Konya and evidenced by the mosaic tiles recovered from the Kubadabad Palace (c. 1236 or early 13th century).

Anatolian Seljuk mosques included more conservative hypostyle constructions alongside less traditional floor plans. An important hypostyle example is the Alaeddin Mosque of Konya (built between 1156 and 1235, with later additions). Mosques in the later Beylik period were more diverse in form, such as the Saruhanid congregational mosque in Manisa (1371), the Isa Bey Mosque in Selçuk (1374), and the İlyas Bey Mosque in Miletus (1304). Madrasas were typically centered around either a traditional open courtyard bordered by a varying number of iwans (e.g. Çifte Minareli Medrese in Erzurum and the Gök Medrese in Sivas) or a central court covered by a dome (e.g. the Karatay and Ince Minareli madrasas in Konya). Monumental caravanserais were also built along trade routes, typically with a fortified exterior appearance, a tall entrance portal decorated with carved stone, and an interior courtyard that sometimes contained a cubic prayer room elevated in the center (e.g. the Sultan Han southwest of Aksaray and another Sultan Han northeast of Kayseri).

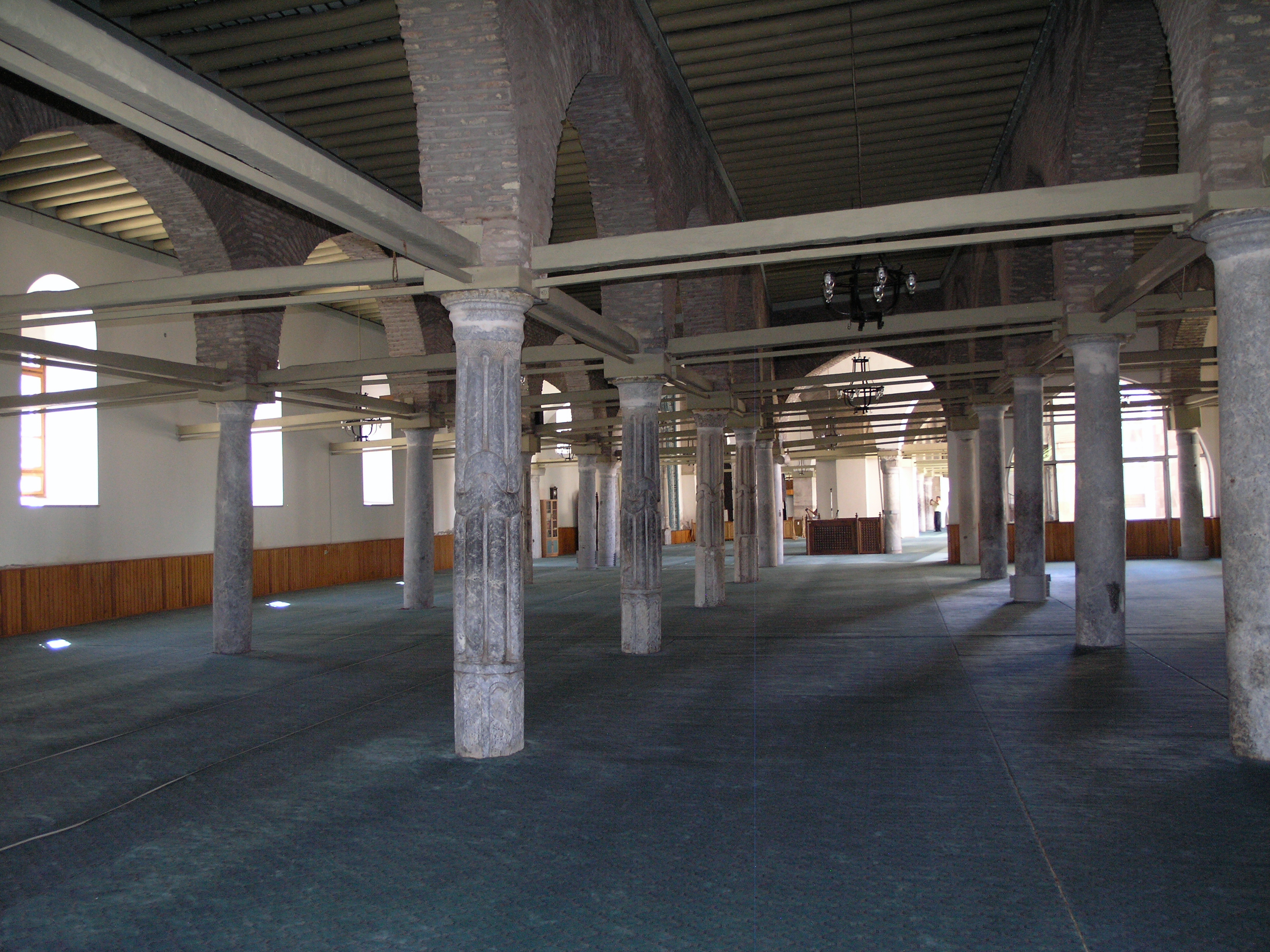
Hypostyle interior of the Alâeddin Mosque in Konya (12th-13th centuries)

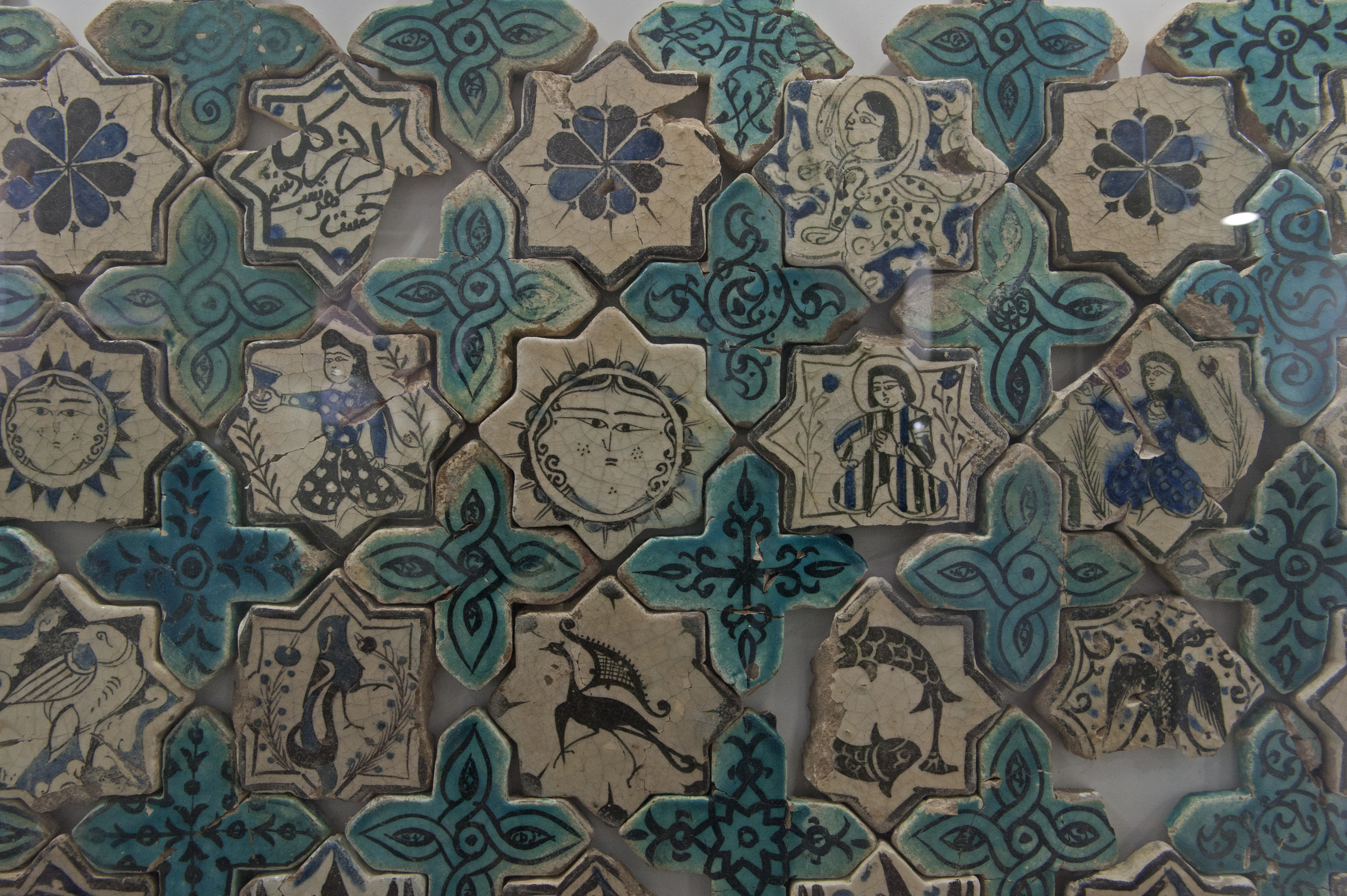
Seljuk mosaic tile decoration from the Kubadabad Palace (early 13th-century Anatolia)

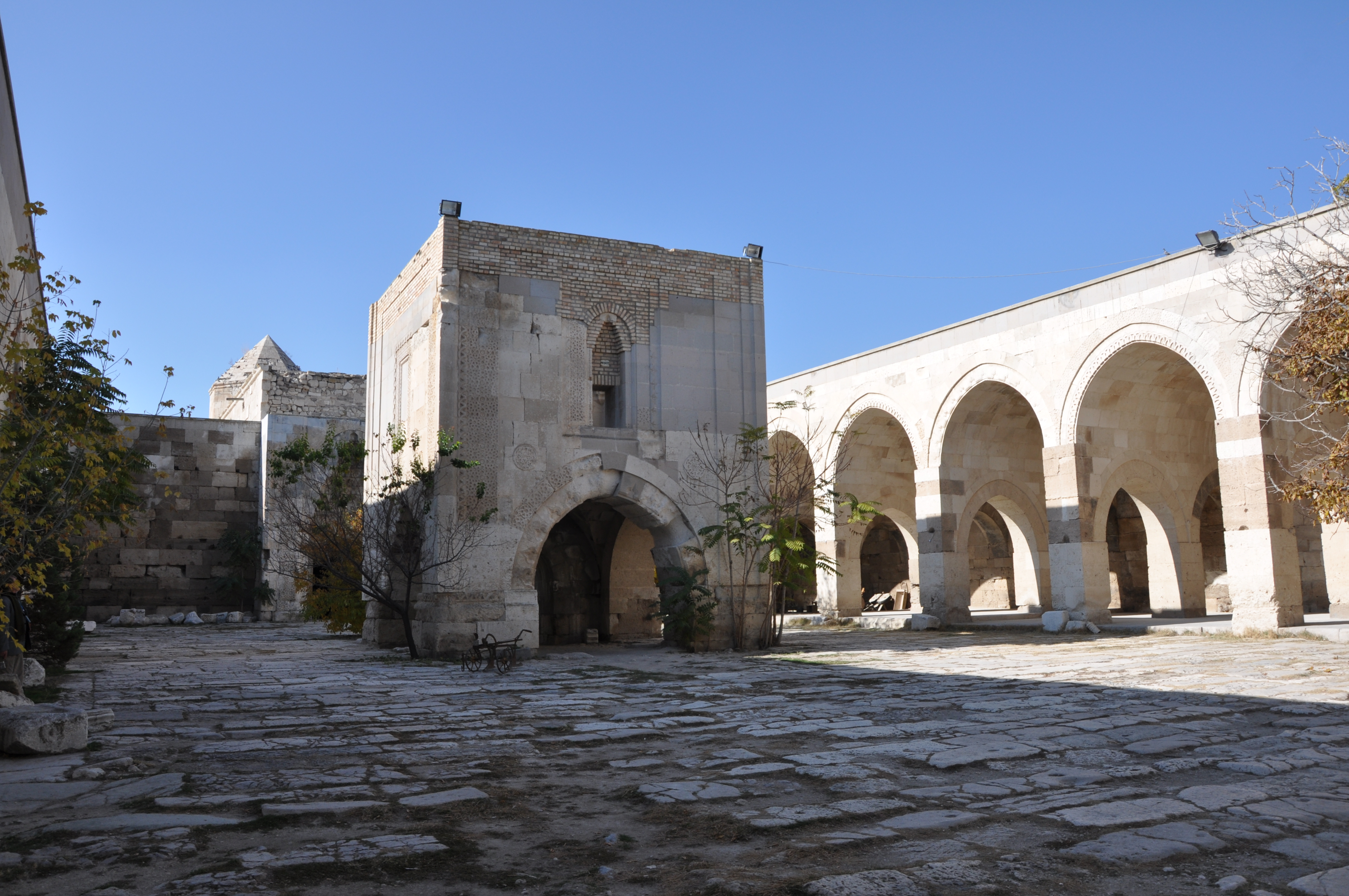
Courtyard of the Sultan Han caravanserai, built in 1229 on the road between Aksaray and Konya

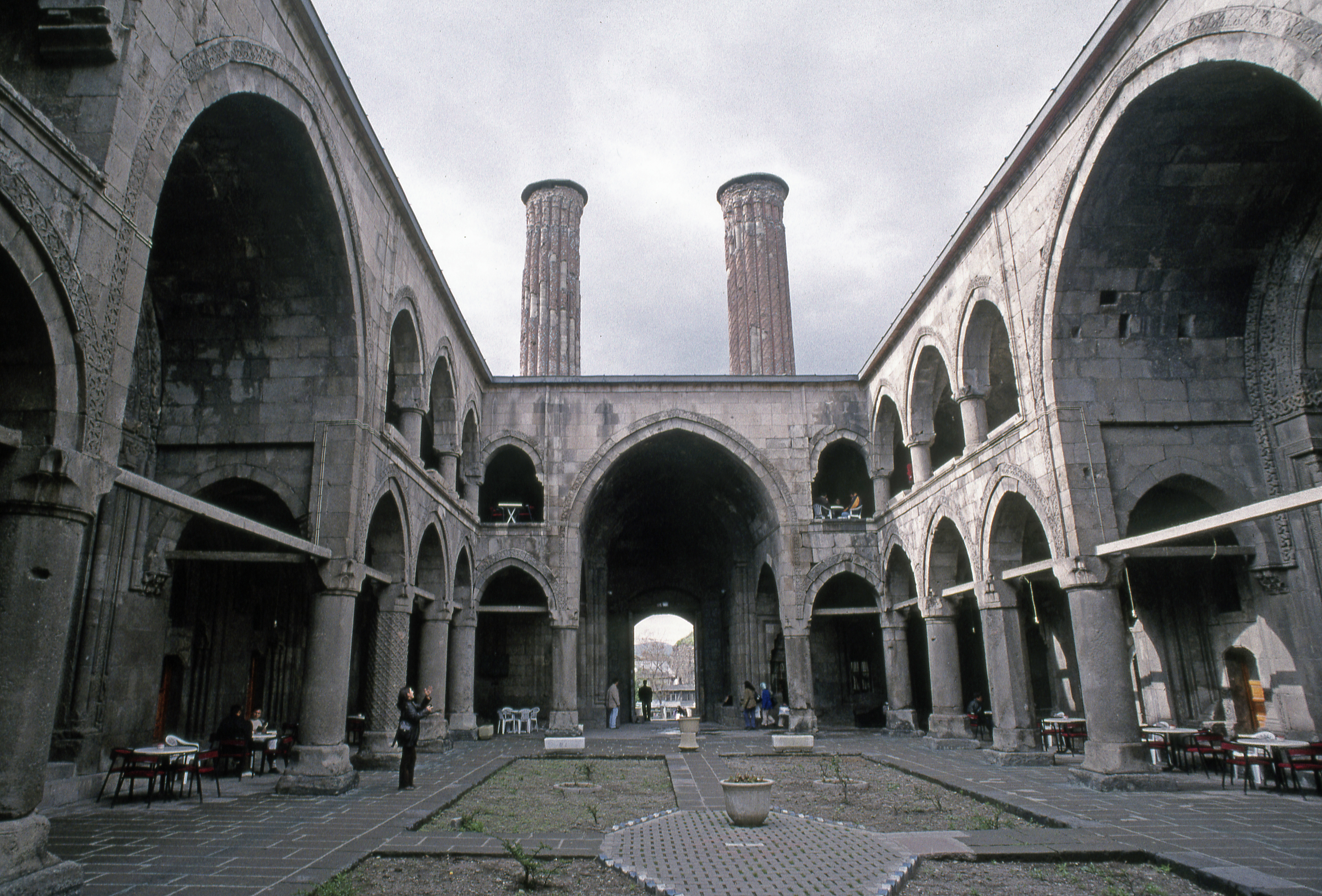
Interior of the Çifte Minareli Medrese in Erzurum (c. 1250)

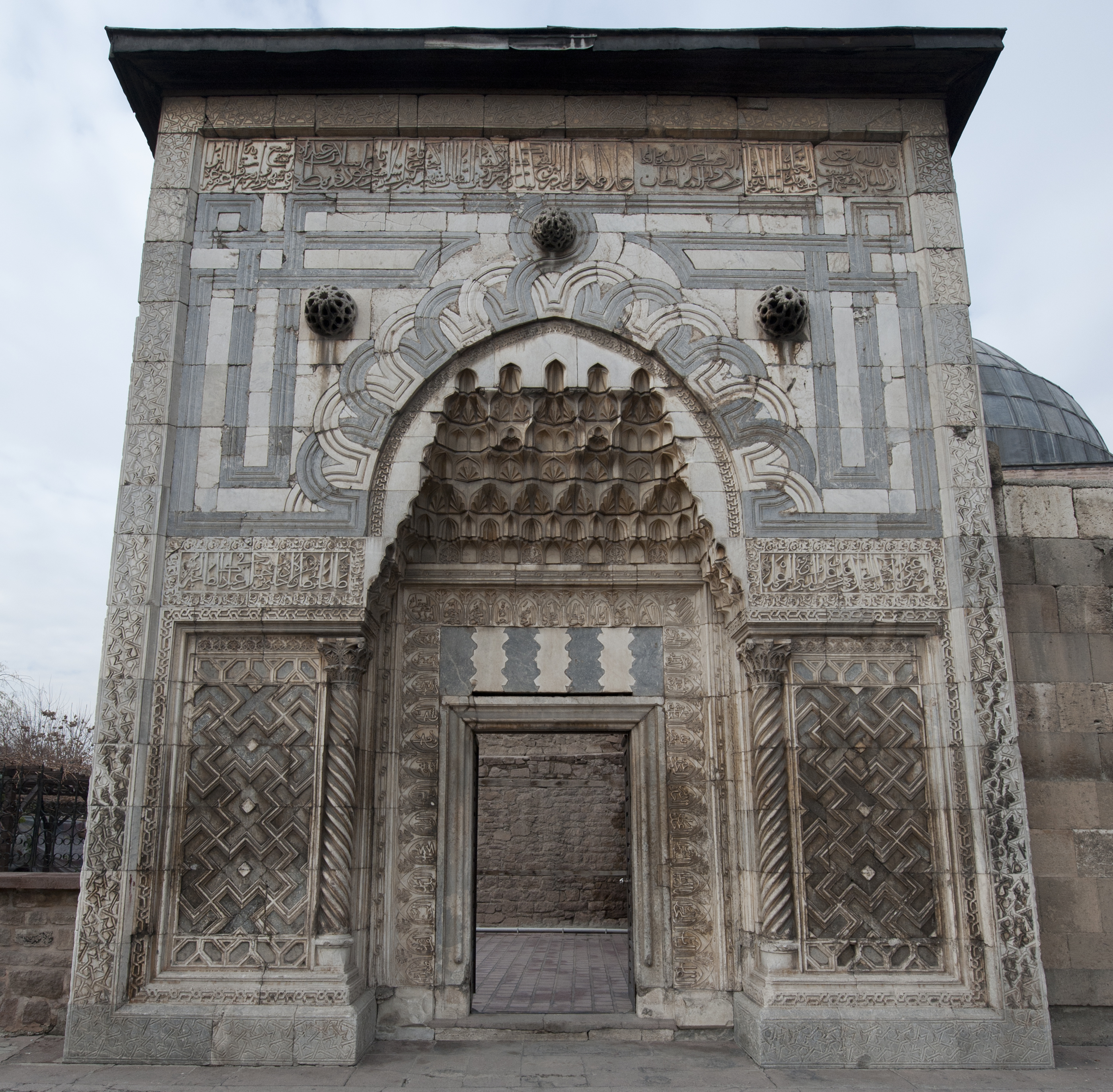
Entrance portal of the Karatay Madrasa in Konya (c. 1251), with muqarnas and ablaq decoration

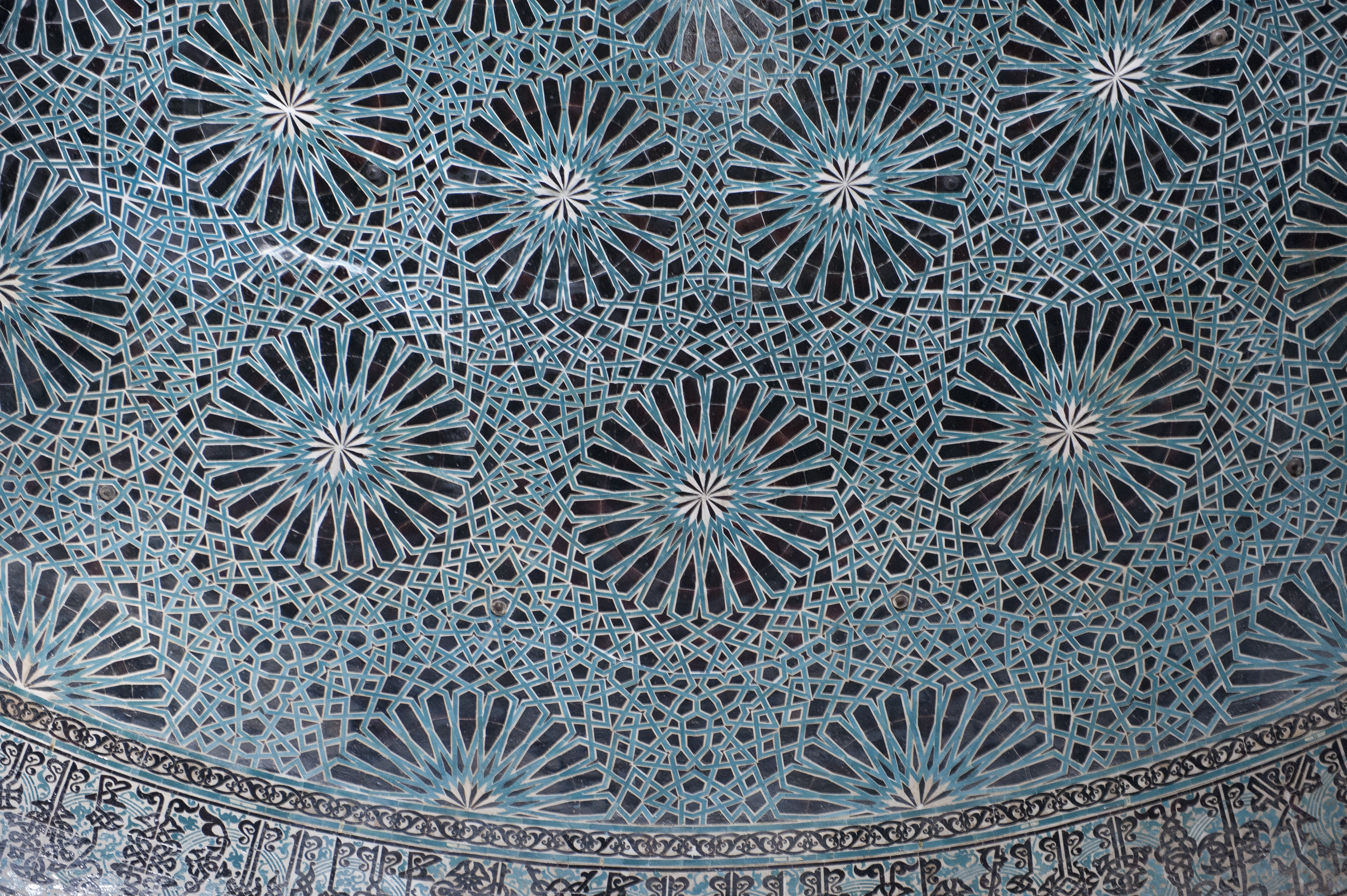
Tile decoration inside the Karatay Madrasa in Konya (c. 1251)

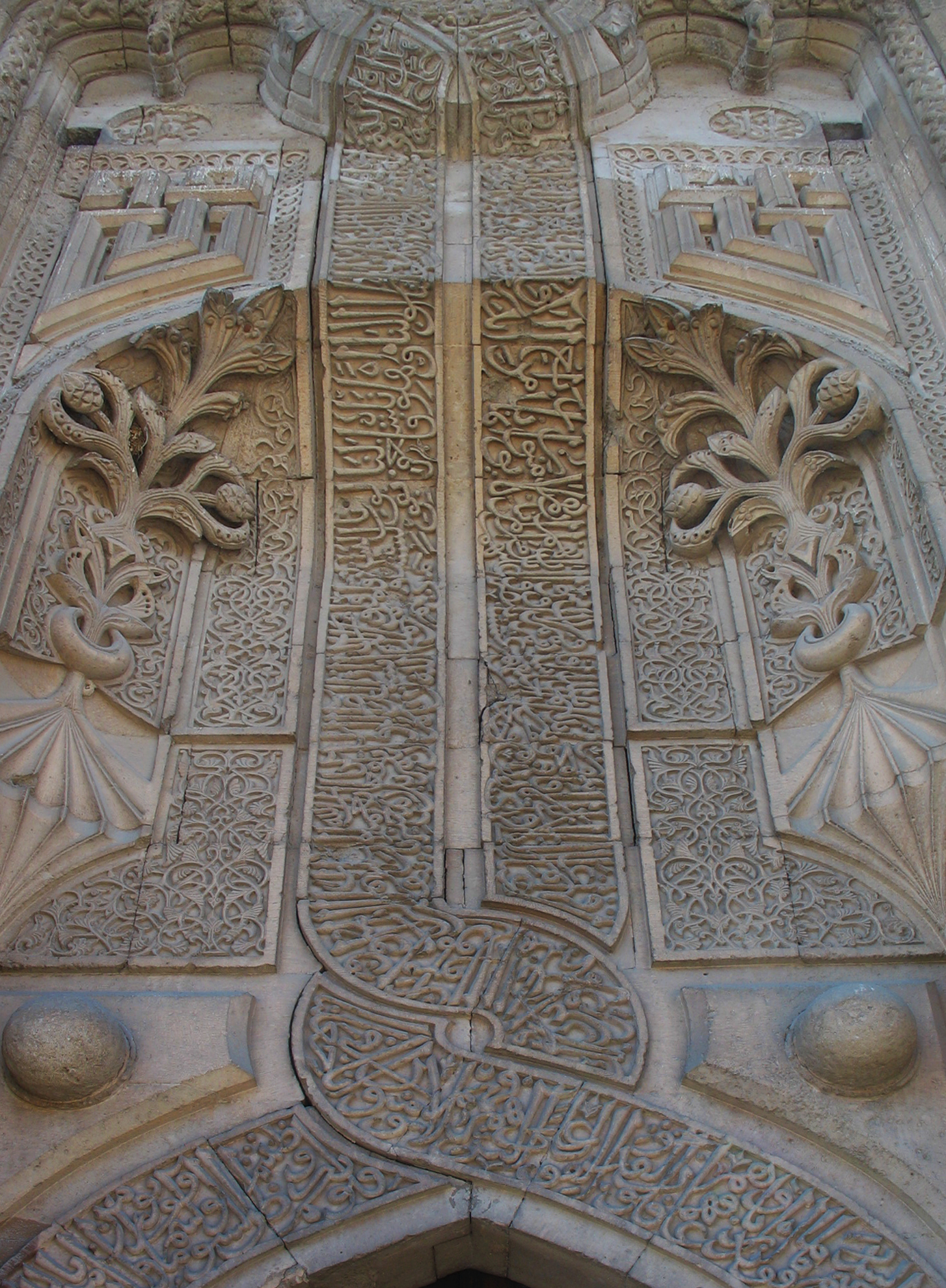
Stone-carved decoration in the entrance portal of the Ince Minareli Medrese in Konya (c. 1265)

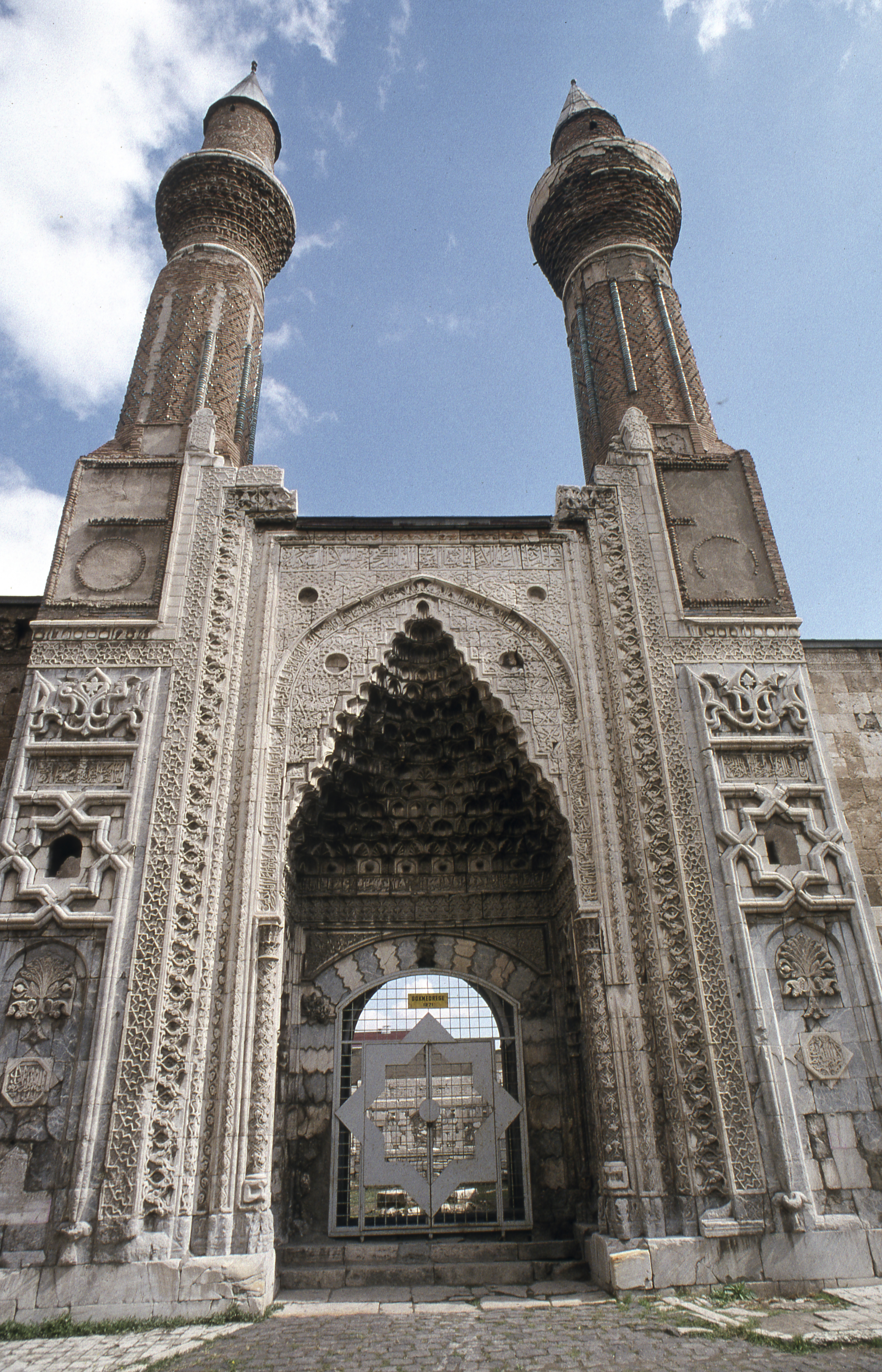
Entrance and minarets of the Gök Medrese in Sivas (1271–2)

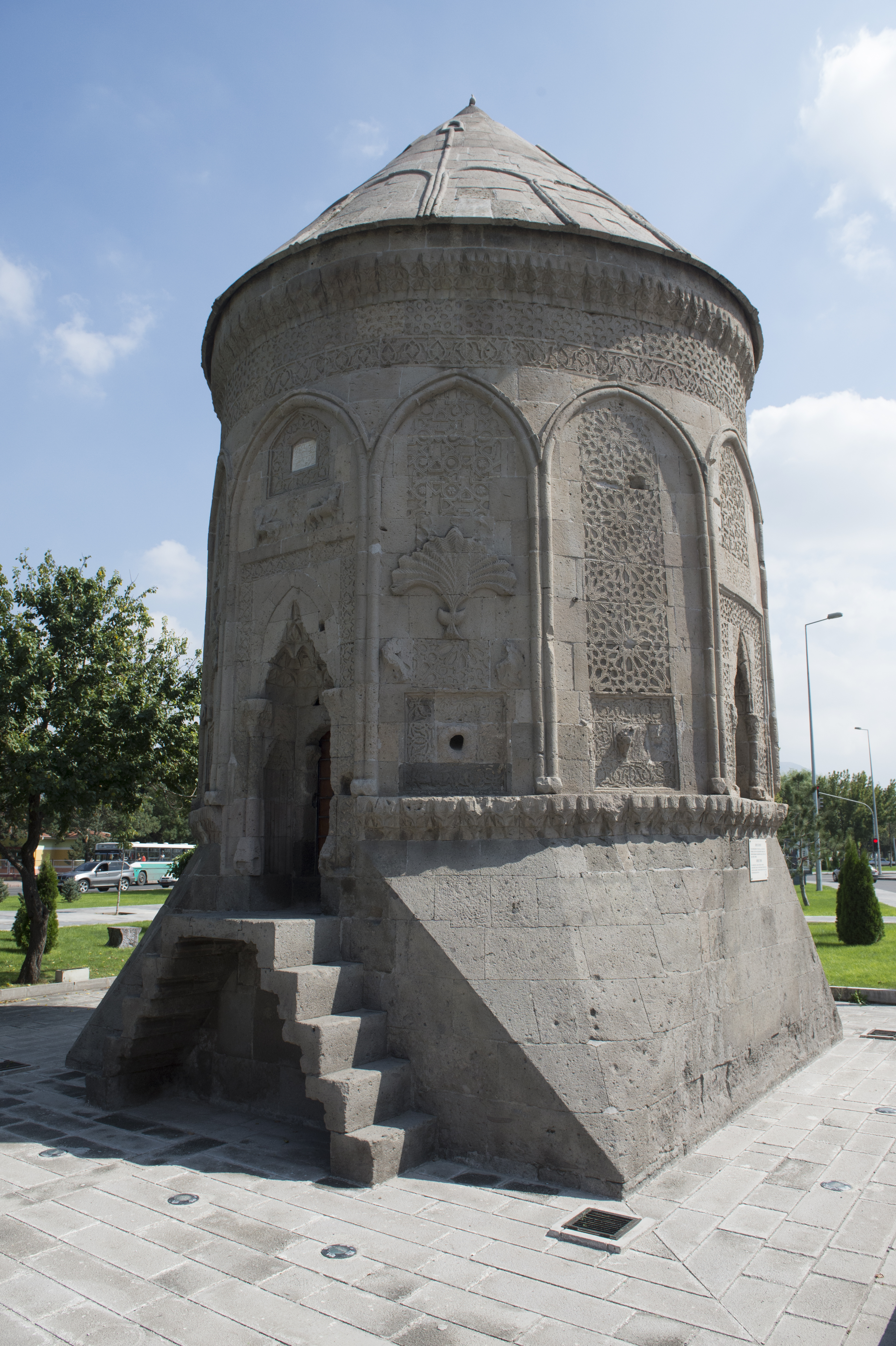
Döner Kümbet in Kayseri (1276), the tomb of a Seljuk princess

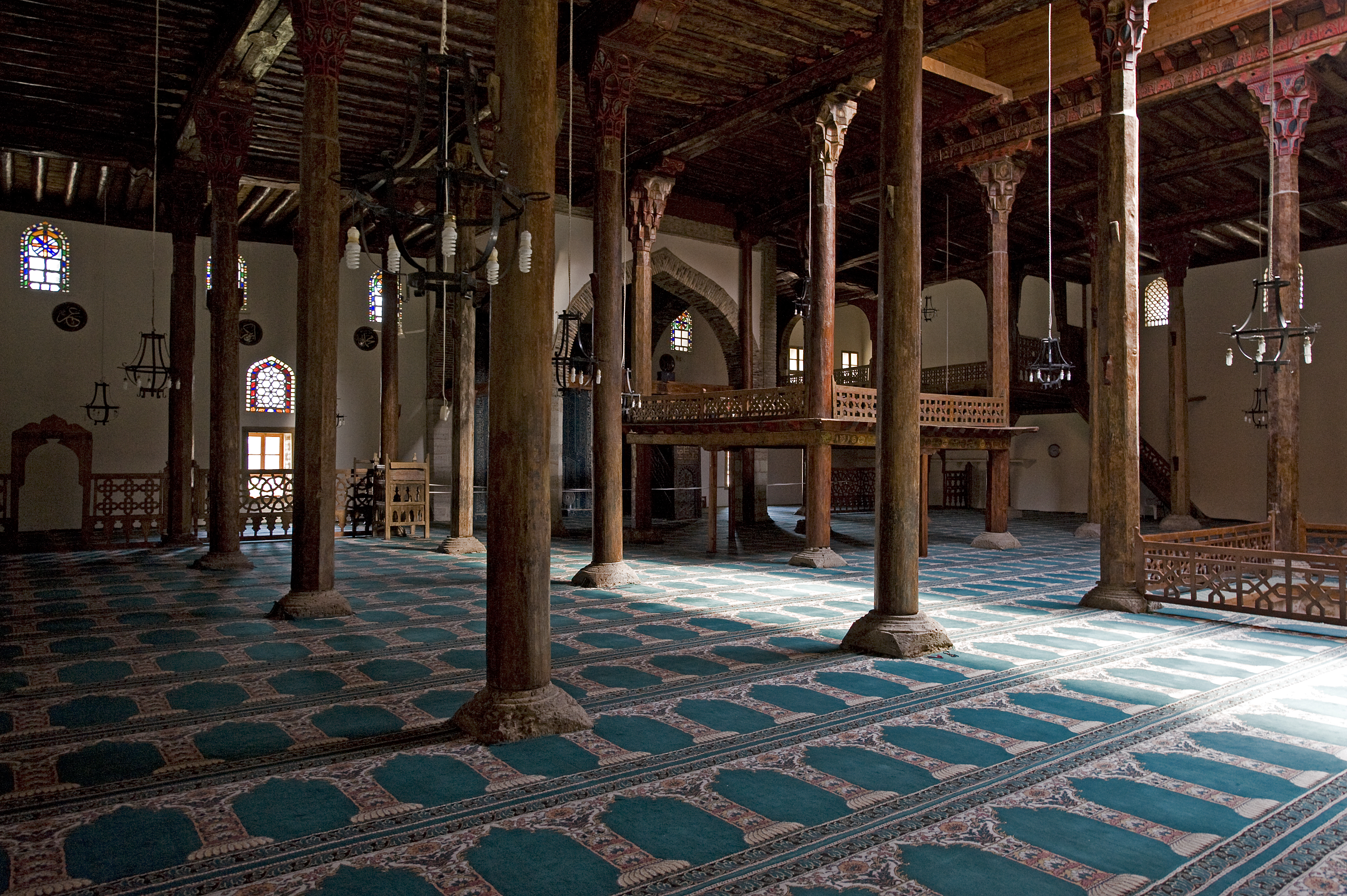
Eşrefoğlu Mosque in Beyşehir (1297), an example of a wooden hypostyle mosque

=== Mamluk ===
The Mamluks were a military corps recruited from slaves that served under the Ayyubid dynasty and eventually took over from that dynasty in 1250, ruling over Egypt, the Levant, and the Hijaz until the Ottoman conquest of 1517. Despite their often tumultuous and violent internal politics, the Mamluk sultans were prolific patrons of architecture and contributed enormously to the repertoire of monuments in historic Cairo, their capital. Some long-reigning sultans, such as Al-Nasir Muhammad (r. 1293–1341, with interruptions) and Qaytbay (r. 1468–1496), were especially prolific. While Cairo was the main center of patronage, Mamluk architecture also appears in other cities of their realm such as Damascus, Jerusalem, Aleppo, and Medina.

Mamluk architecture is distinguished in part by the construction of multi-functional buildings whose floor plans became increasingly creative and complex due to the limited available space in the city and the desire to make monuments visually dominant in their urban surroundings. Patrons, including sultans and high-ranking emirs, typically set out to build mausoleums for themselves but attached to them various charitable structures such as madrasas, khanqahs, sabils, or mosques. The cruciform or four-iwan floor plan was adopted for madrasas and became more common for new monumental complexes than the traditional hypostyle mosque, although the vaulted iwans of the early period were replaced with flat-roofed iwans in the later period. The decoration of monuments also became more elaborate over time, with stone-carving and colored marble paneling and mosaics (including ablaq) replacing stucco as the most dominant architectural decoration. Monumental decorated entrance portals became common compared to earlier periods, often carved with muqarnas. Influences from the Syrian region, Ilkhanid Iran, and possibly even Venice were evident in these trends. Minarets, which were also elaborate, usually consisted of three tiers separated by balconies, with each tier having a different design than the others. Domes also transitioned from wooden or brick structures, sometimes of bulbous shape, to pointed stone domes with complex geometric or arabesque motifs carved into their outer surfaces. The peak of this stone dome architecture was achieved under the reign of Qaytbay in the late 15th century.

After the Ottoman conquest of 1517, new Ottoman-style buildings were introduced, however the Mamluk style continued to be repeated or combined with Ottoman elements in many subsequent monuments. Some building types from the late Mamluk period, such as sabil-kuttabs (a combination of sabil and kuttab) and multi-storied caravanserais (wikalas or khans), actually grew in number during the Ottoman period. In modern times, from the late 19th century onwards, a Neo-Mamluk style was also used, partly as a nationalist response against Ottoman and European styles, in an effort to promote local "Egyptian" styles (though the architects were sometimes Europeans). Examples of this style are the Museum of Islamic Arts in Cairo, the Al-Rifa'i Mosque, the Abu al-Abbas al-Mursi Mosque in Alexandria, and numerous private and public buildings such as those of Heliopolis.

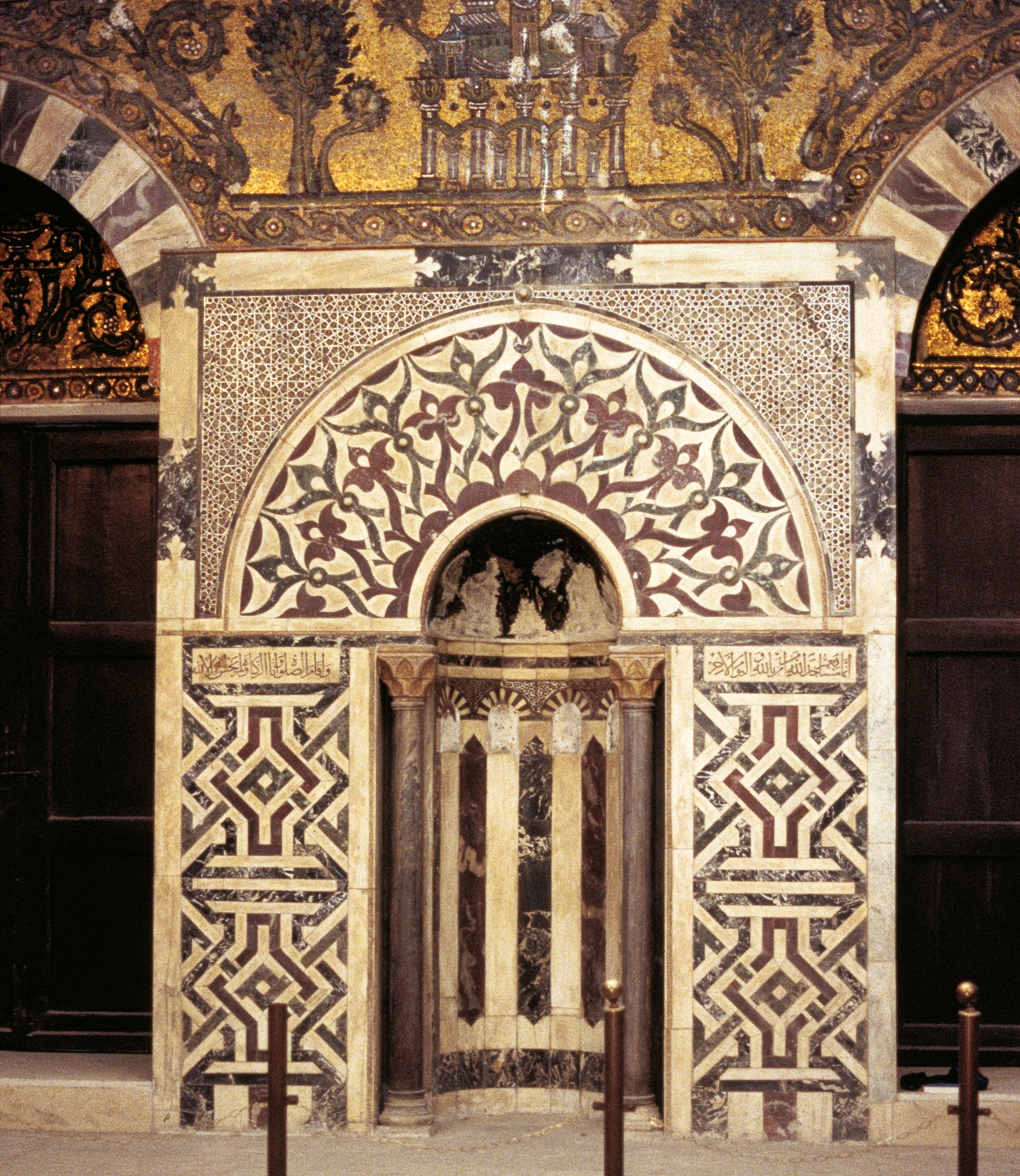
Mihrab of the Mausoleum of Sultan Baybars in Damascus (built 1277–1281)

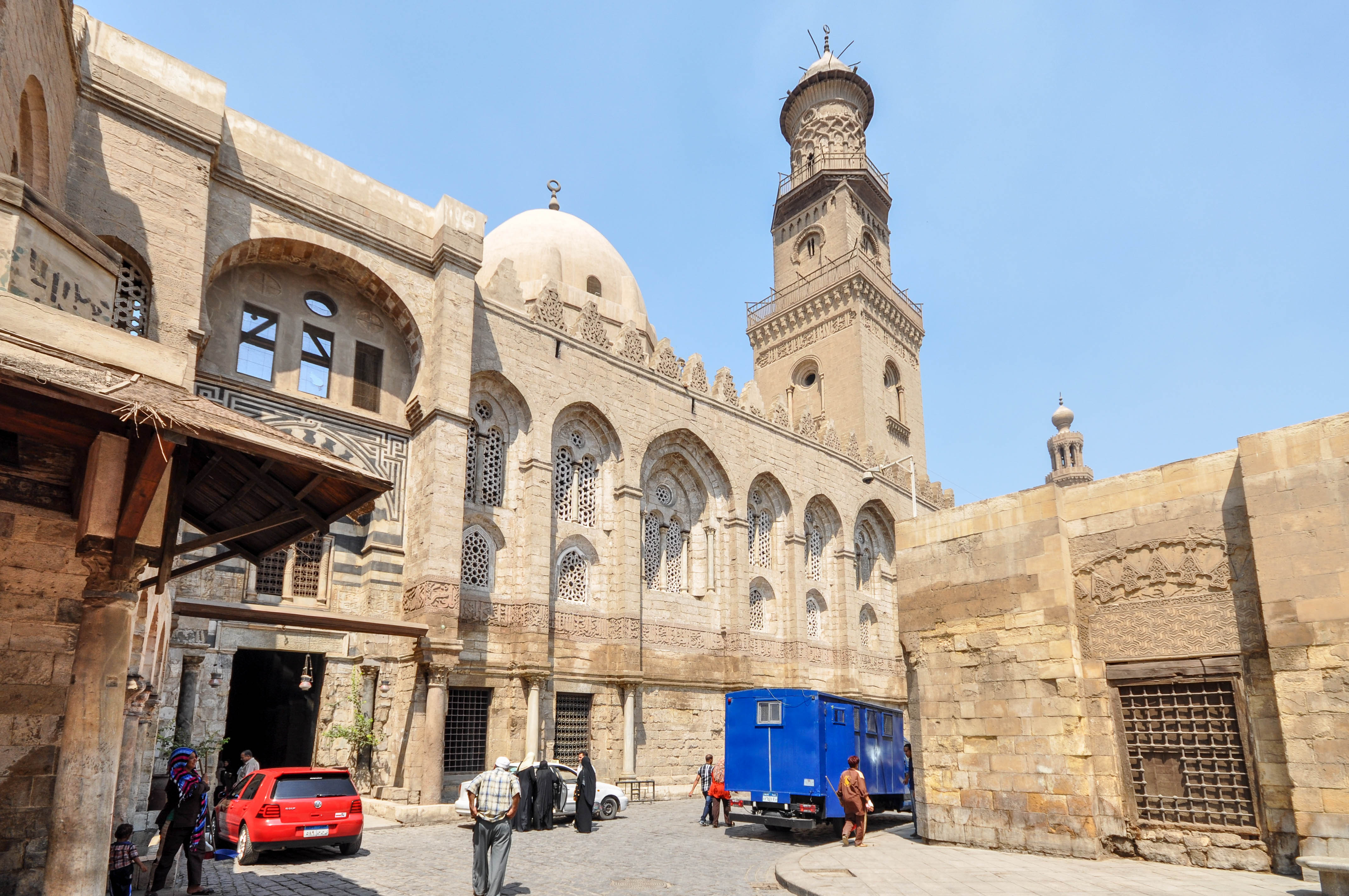
Complex of Sultan Qalawun in Cairo (built in 1284–85). It included a mausoleum, a madrasa, and a highly important maristan (hospital).

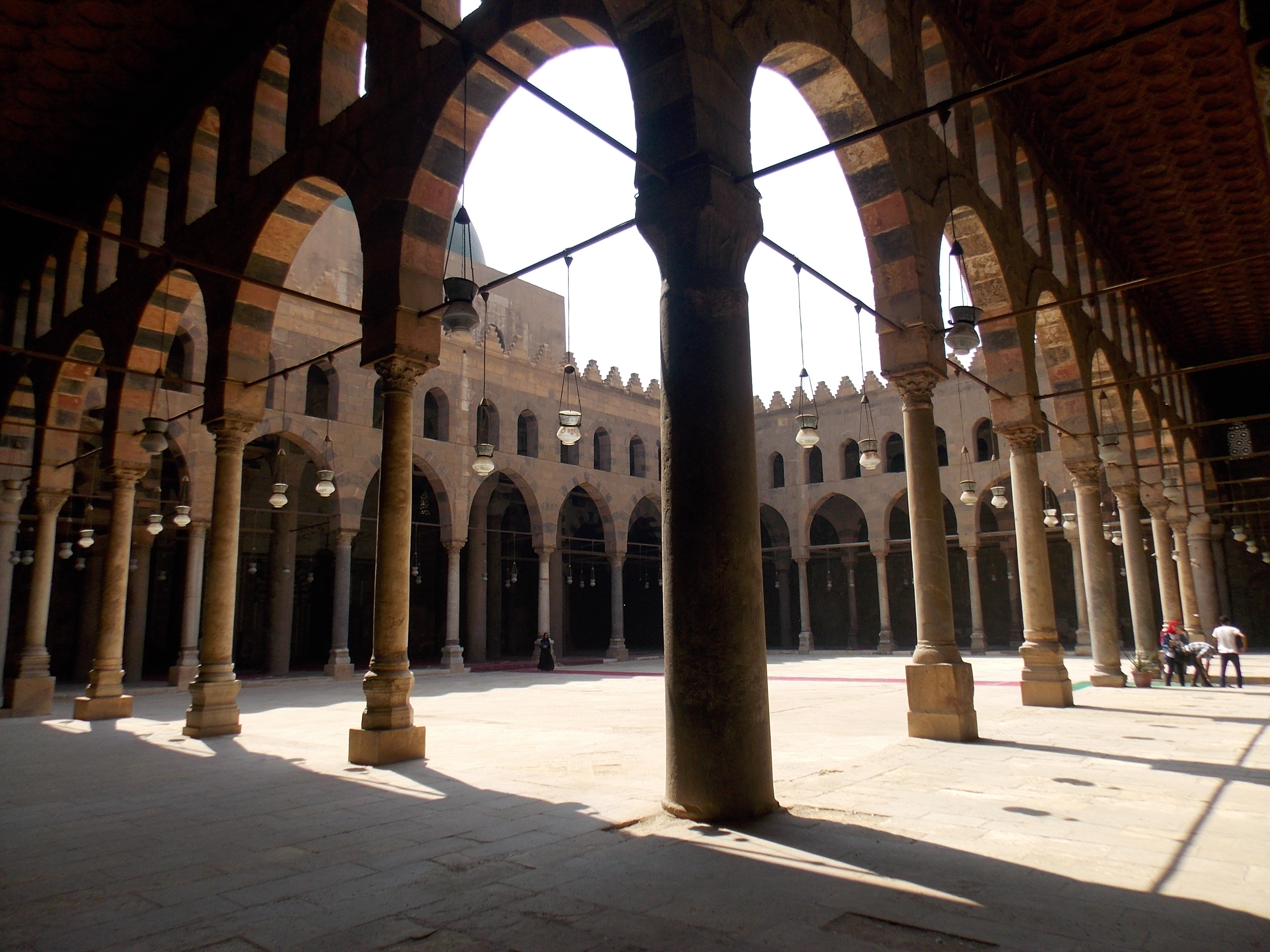
Mosque of al-Nasir Muhammad (built in 1318 and modified in 1335) at the Citadel of Cairo

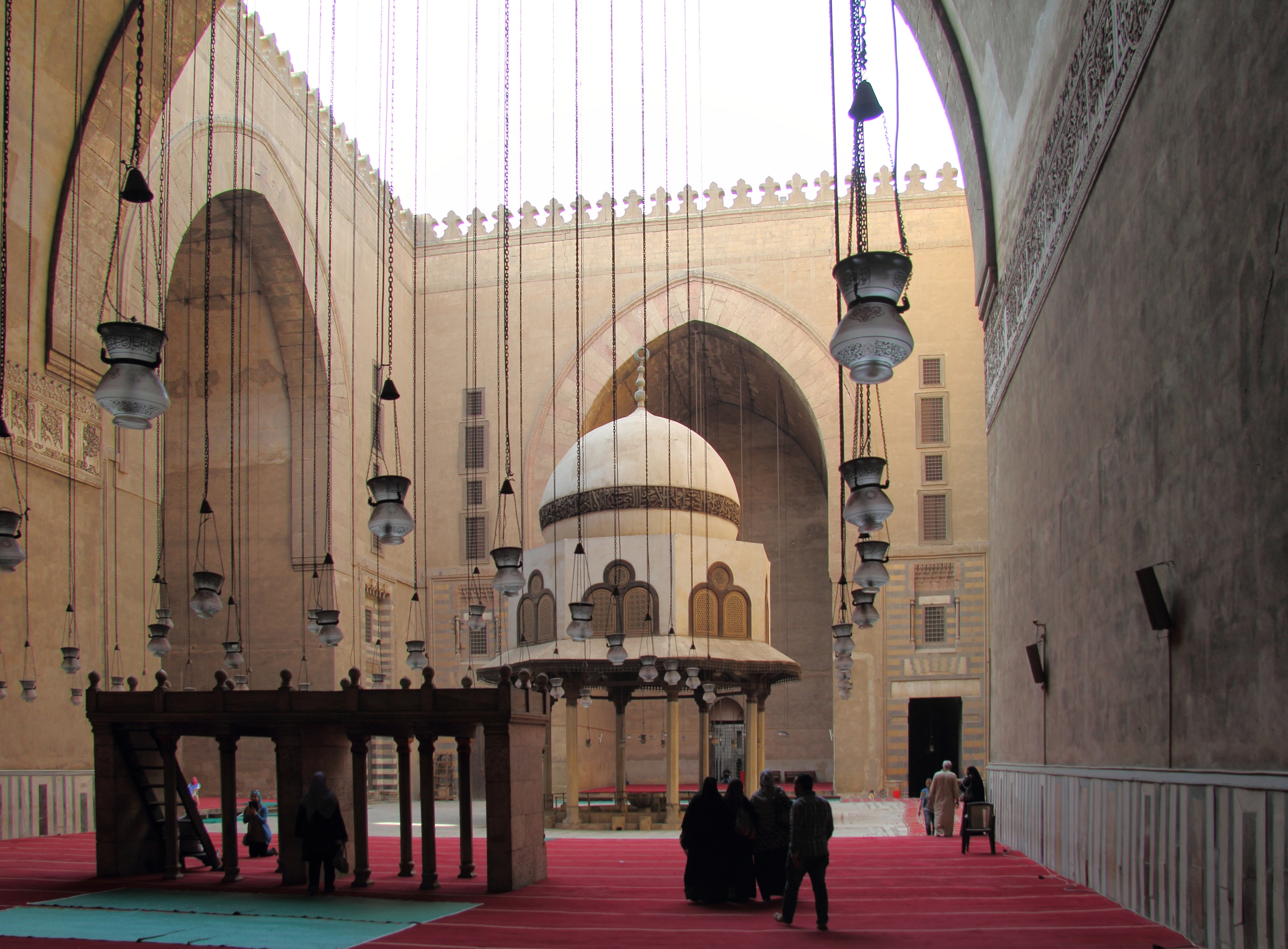
The Madrasa-Mosque of Sultan Hasan (built between 1356 and 1361), the largest Mamluk monument

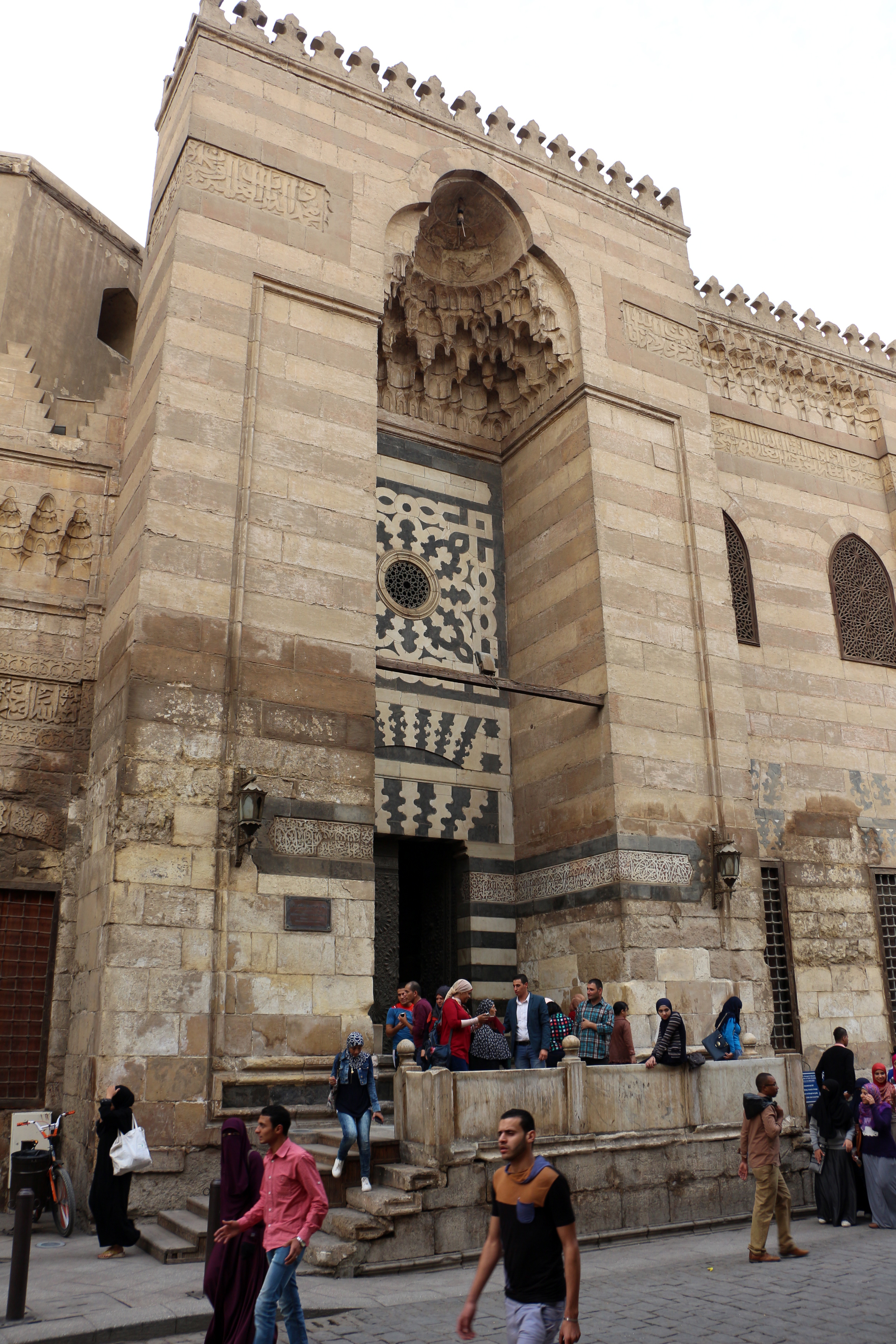
Projecting entrance portal of the Madrasa-Mosque of Sultan Barquq (built between 1384 and 1386)

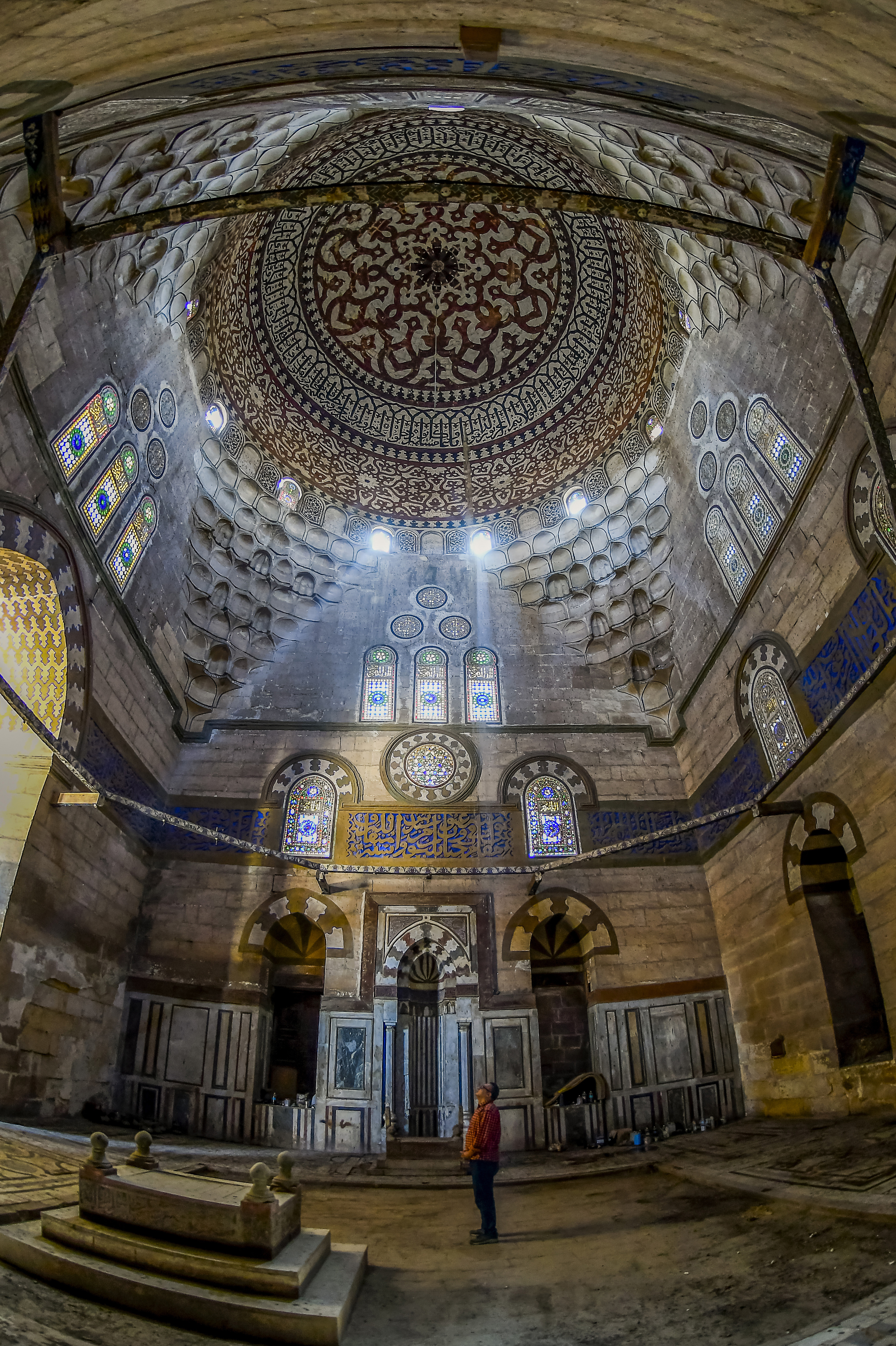
Interior of a mausoleum in the Khanqah-Mosque of Faraj ibn Barquq (built between 1400 and 1411)

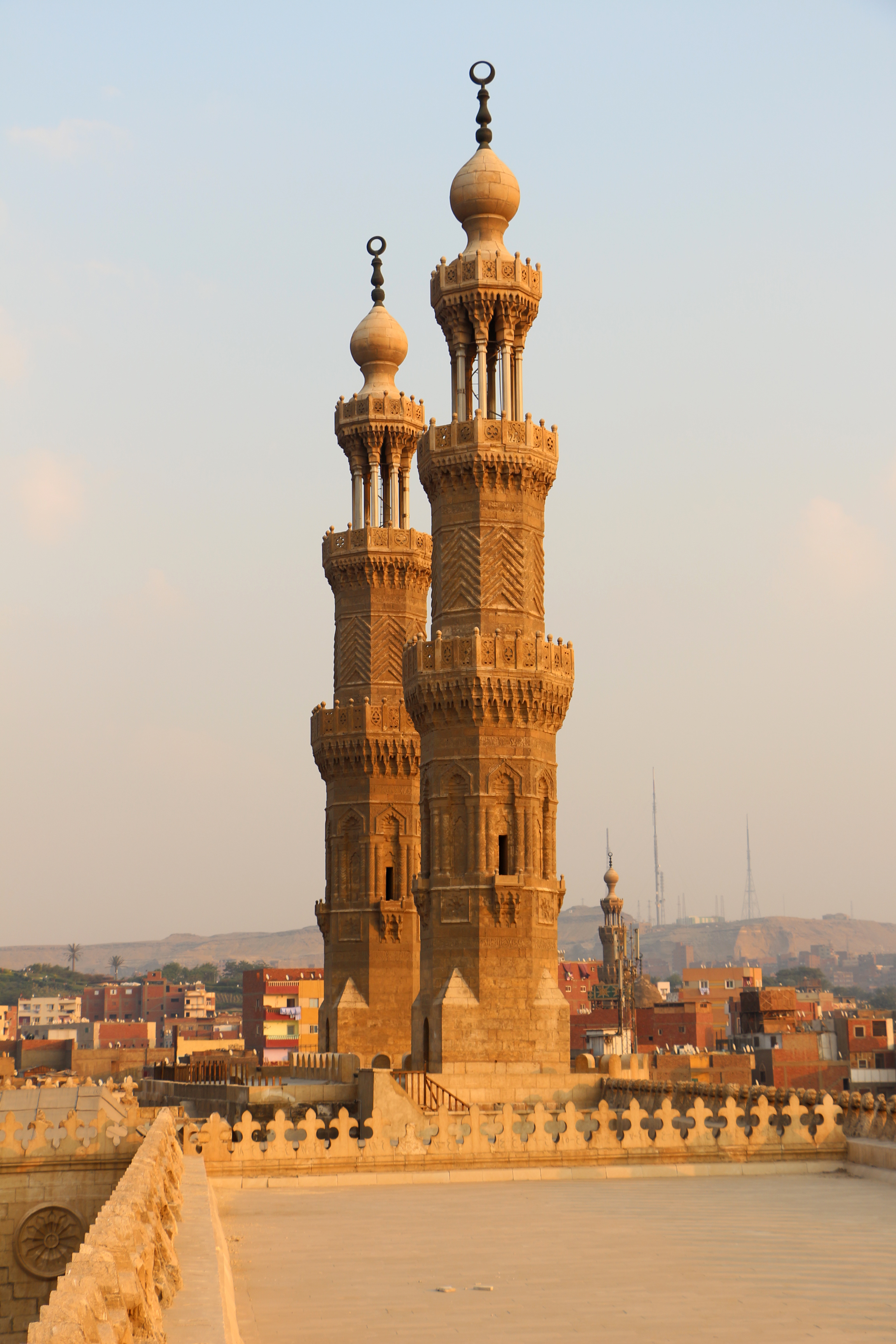
Twin minarets of Bab Zuweila, built between 1415 and 1420 for the nearby Mosque of al-Mu'ayyad Shaykh

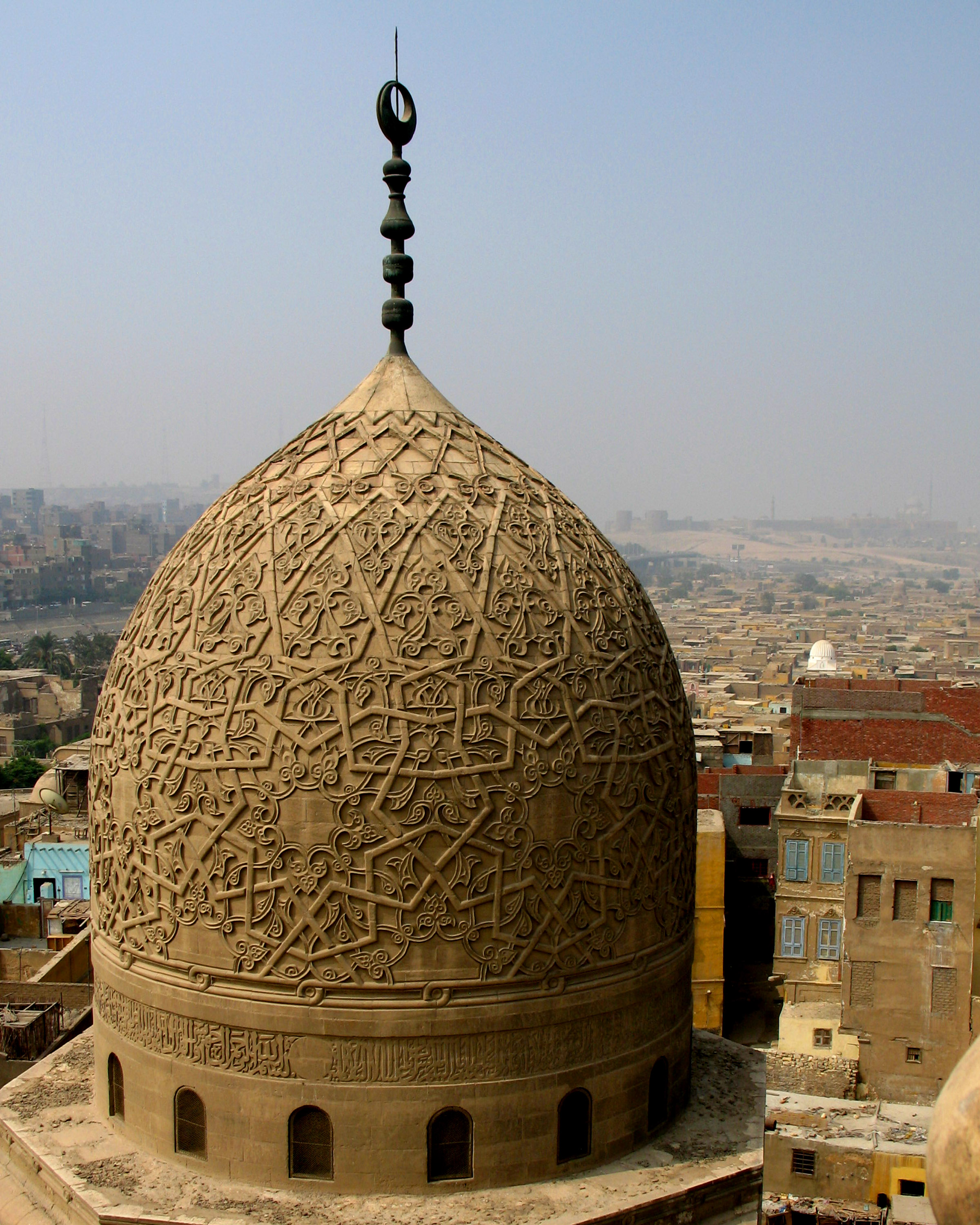
Carved stone dome of the Funerary complex of Sultan Qaytbay (completed in 1474) in the Northern Cemetery of Cairo

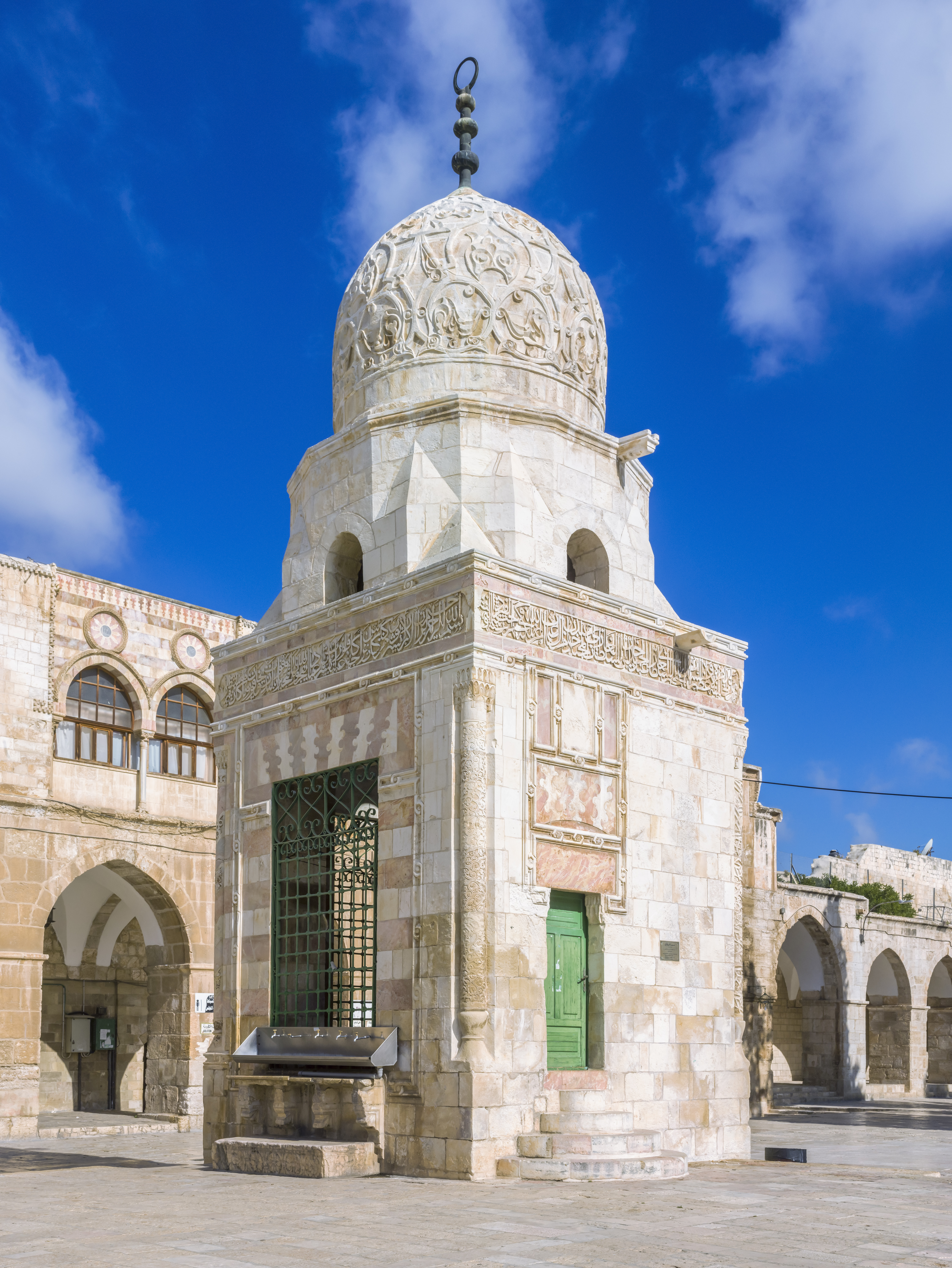
Sabil of Qaytbay (1482) at Al-Aqsa, Jerusalem

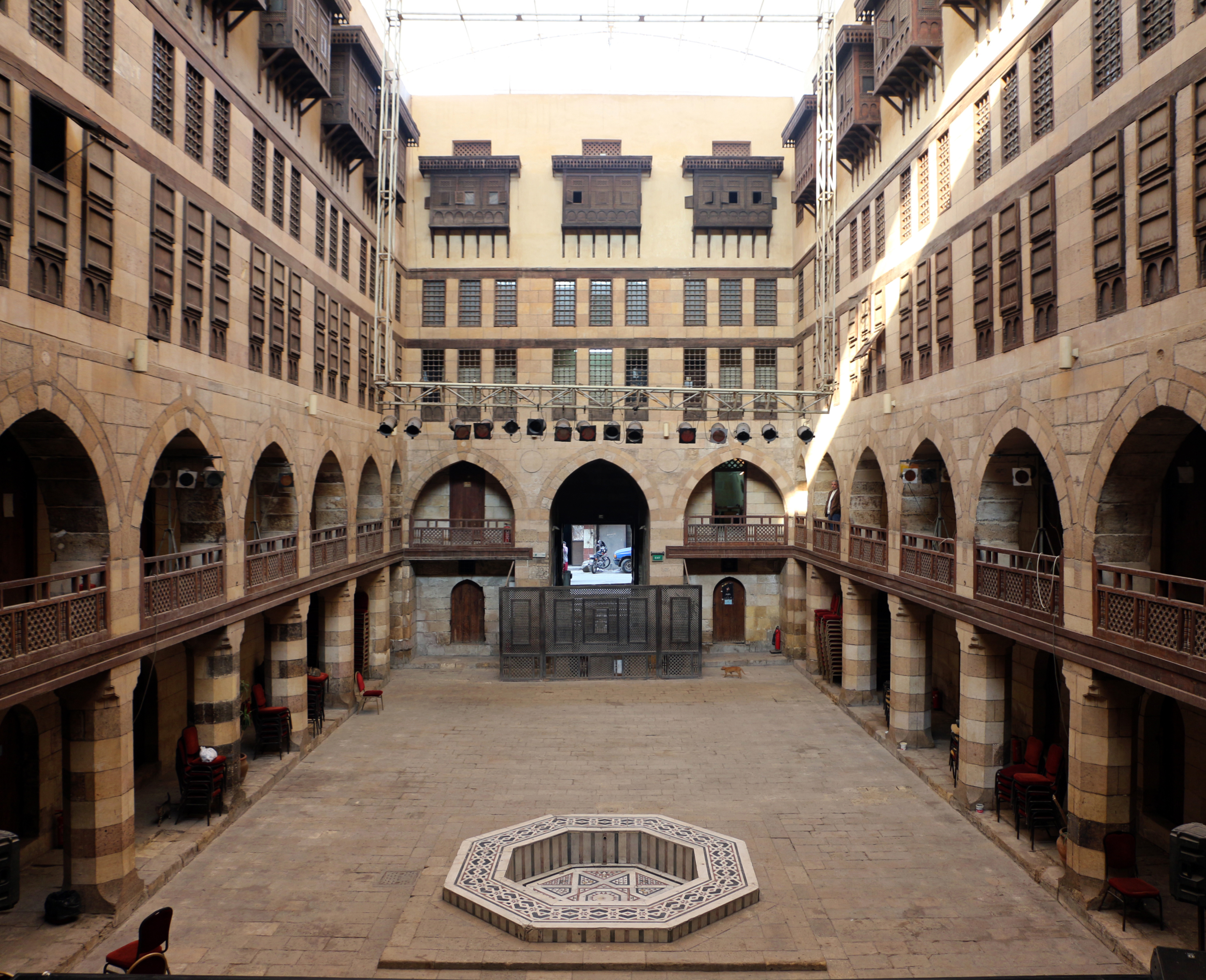
Wikala of Sultan al-Ghuri (1505), example of an urban caravanserai in Cairo

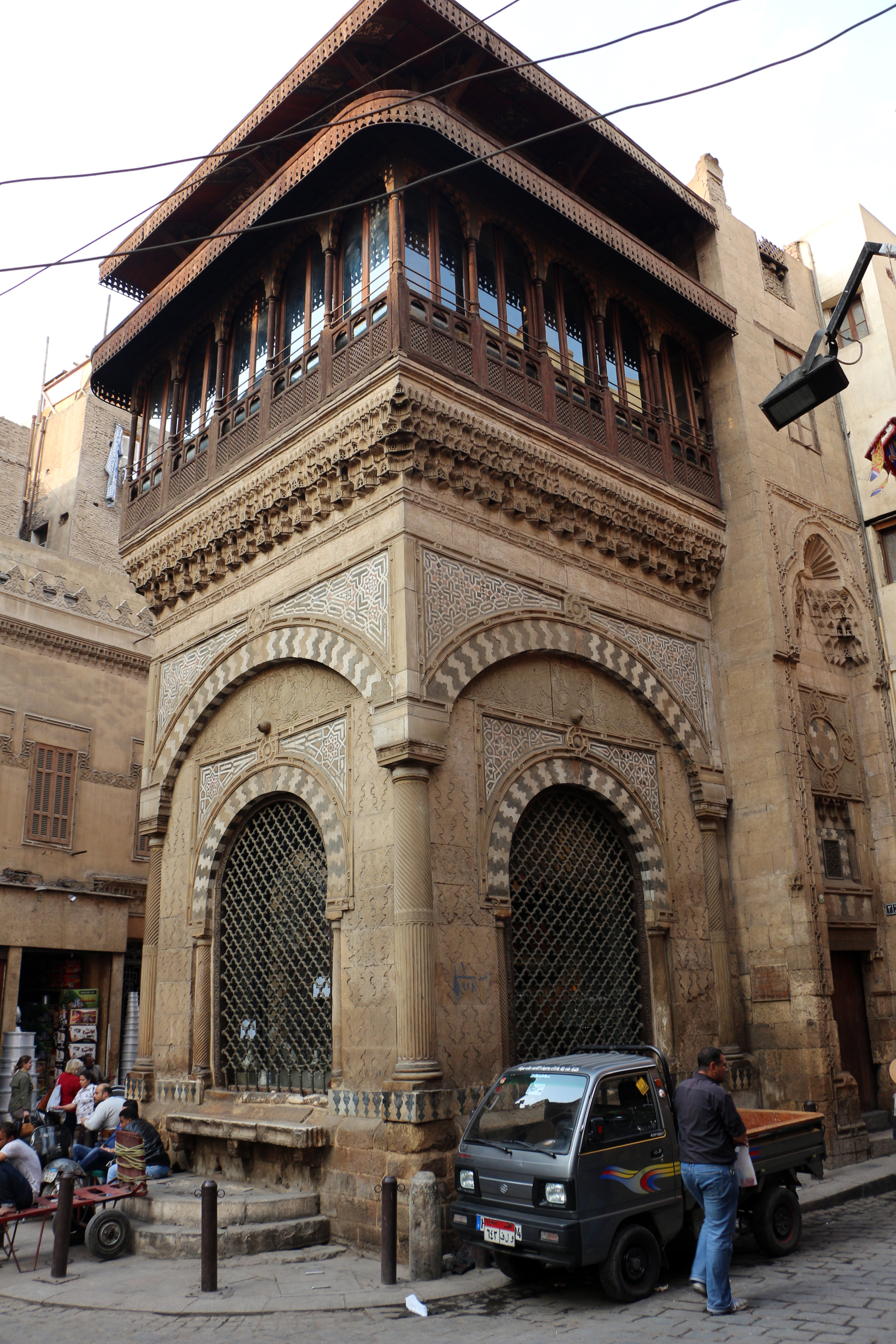
Sabil-Kuttab of Abd ar-Rahman Katkhuda (1744), which combines Mamluk and Ottoman elements

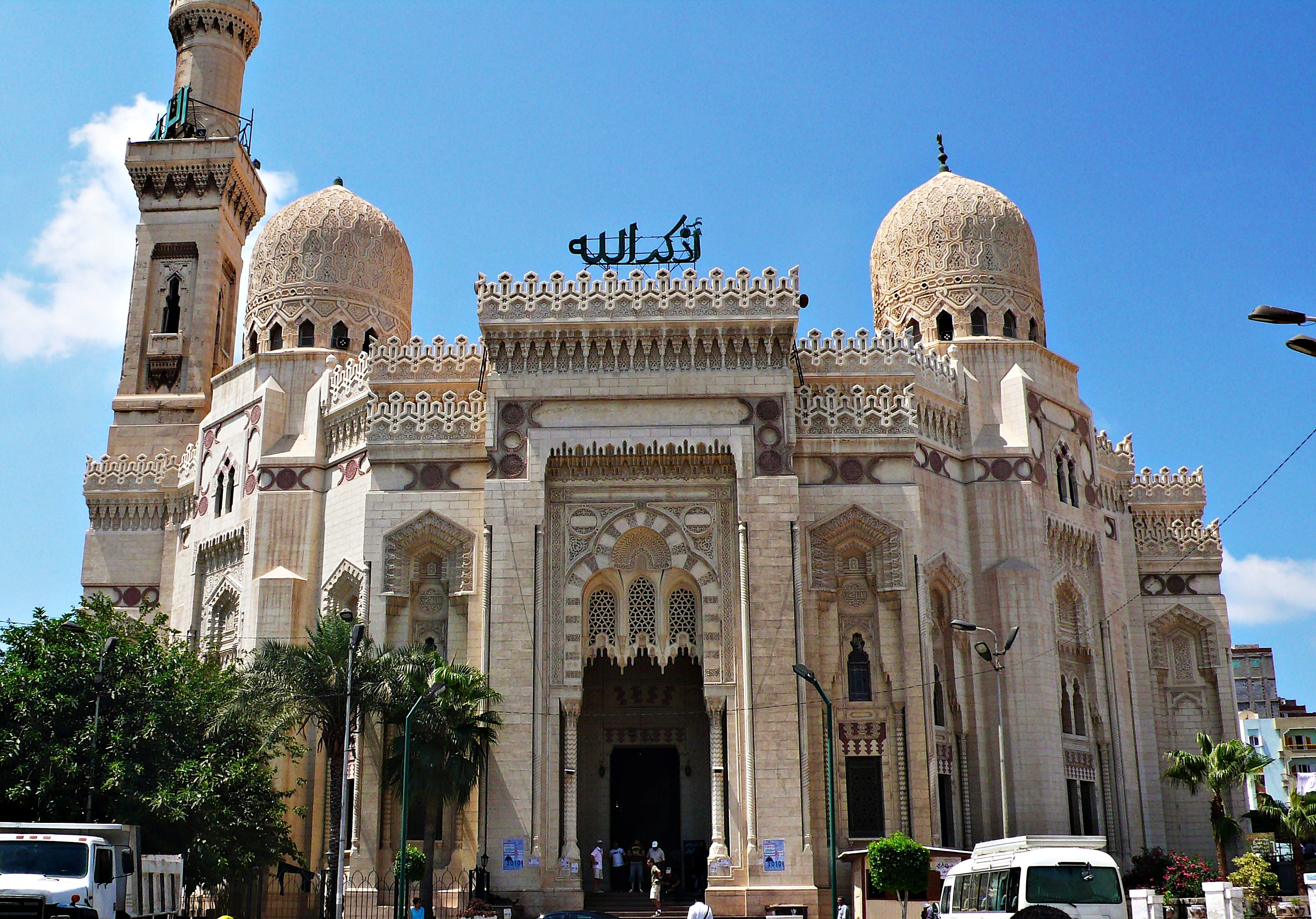
Abu al-Abbas al-Mursi Mosque in Alexandria, built in the 1940s in a neo-Mamluk style

=== Ottoman ===
The architecture of the Ottoman Empire developed from earlier Seljuk architecture, with influences from Byzantine and Iranian architecture along with architectural traditions of the Balkans and other parts of Middle East. The classical architecture of the Ottoman Empire was a mixture of native Turkish tradition and influences from Hagia Sophia. One of the best representatives of this period is Mimar Sinan, whose works include the Süleymaniye Mosque in Istanbul and the Selimiye Mosque in Edirne.

Beginning in the 18th century, Ottoman architecture was influenced by the Baroque architecture in Western Europe. Nuruosmaniye Mosque is one of the surviving examples from this period. The last Ottoman period saw more influences from Western Europe, brought in by architects such those from the Balyan family. This period also saw the development of a new architectural style called neo-Ottoman or Ottoman revivalism, also known as the First National Architectural Movement, by architects such as Mimar Kemaleddin and Vedat Tek.

While Istanbul was the main site of imperial patronage for most of the empire's history, the early capitals of Bursa and Edirne also contain a concentration of Ottoman monuments. Ottoman architecture is also found across the empire's provinces, ranging from Eastern Europe to the Middle East to North Africa. Major religious monuments, such as those sponsored by sultan and his family, were typically architectural complexes, known as a külliye, which had multiple elements providing various charitable services. These complexes were governed and managed with the help of a vakif agreement (Arabic waqf). For example, the Fatih Mosque in Istanbul was part of a very large külliye founded by Mehmed II, built between 1463 and 1470, which also included: a tabhane (guesthouse for travelers), an imaret (charitable kitchen), a darüşşifa (hospital), a caravanserai, a mektep (primary school), a library, a hammam (bathhouse), a cemetery with the founder's mausoleum, and eight madrasas along with their annexes. The buildings were arranged in a regular, partly symmetrical layout with the monumental mosque at its center, although not all the structures have survived to the present day.

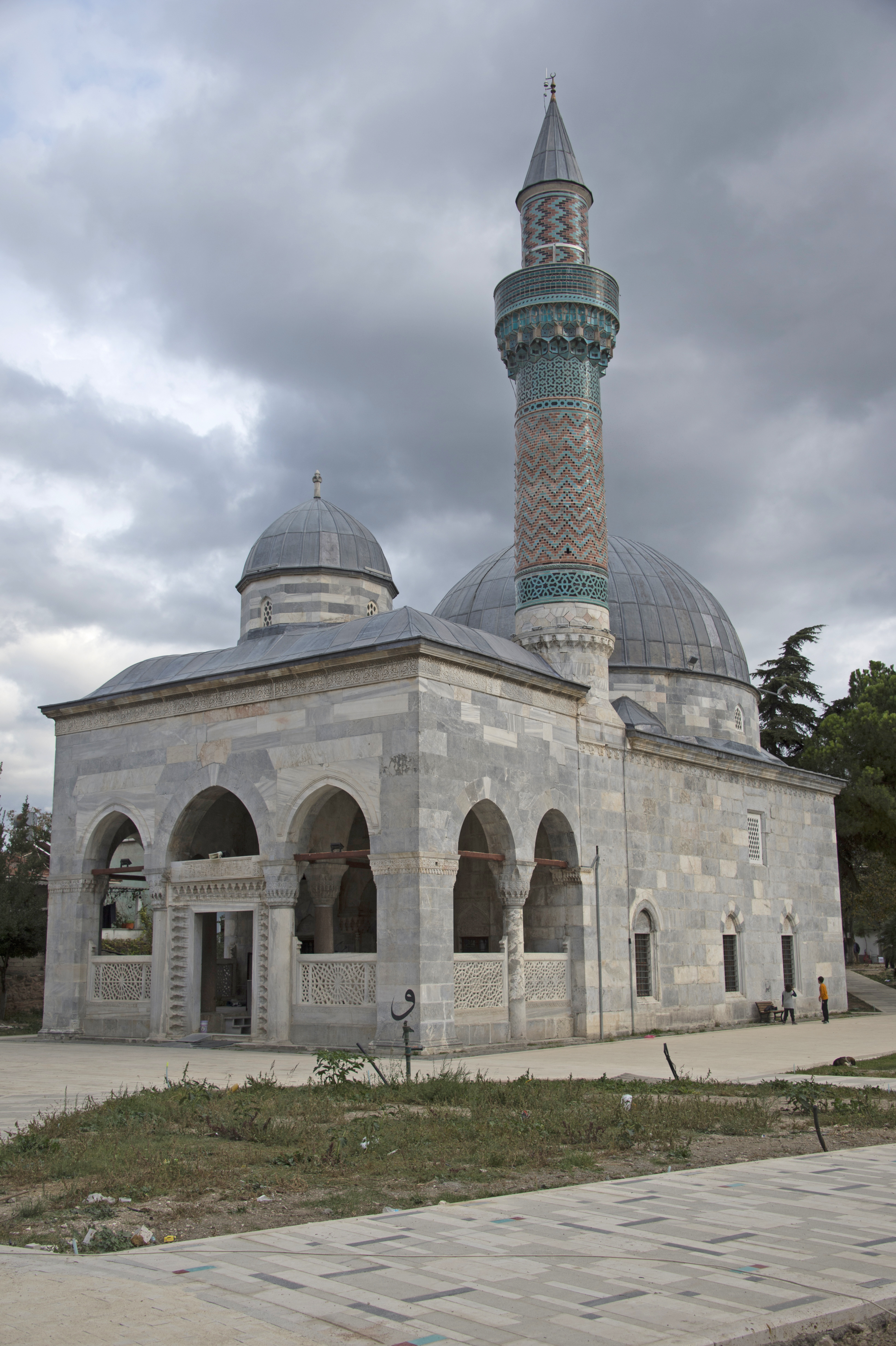
The Green Mosque in Iznik (late 14th century)

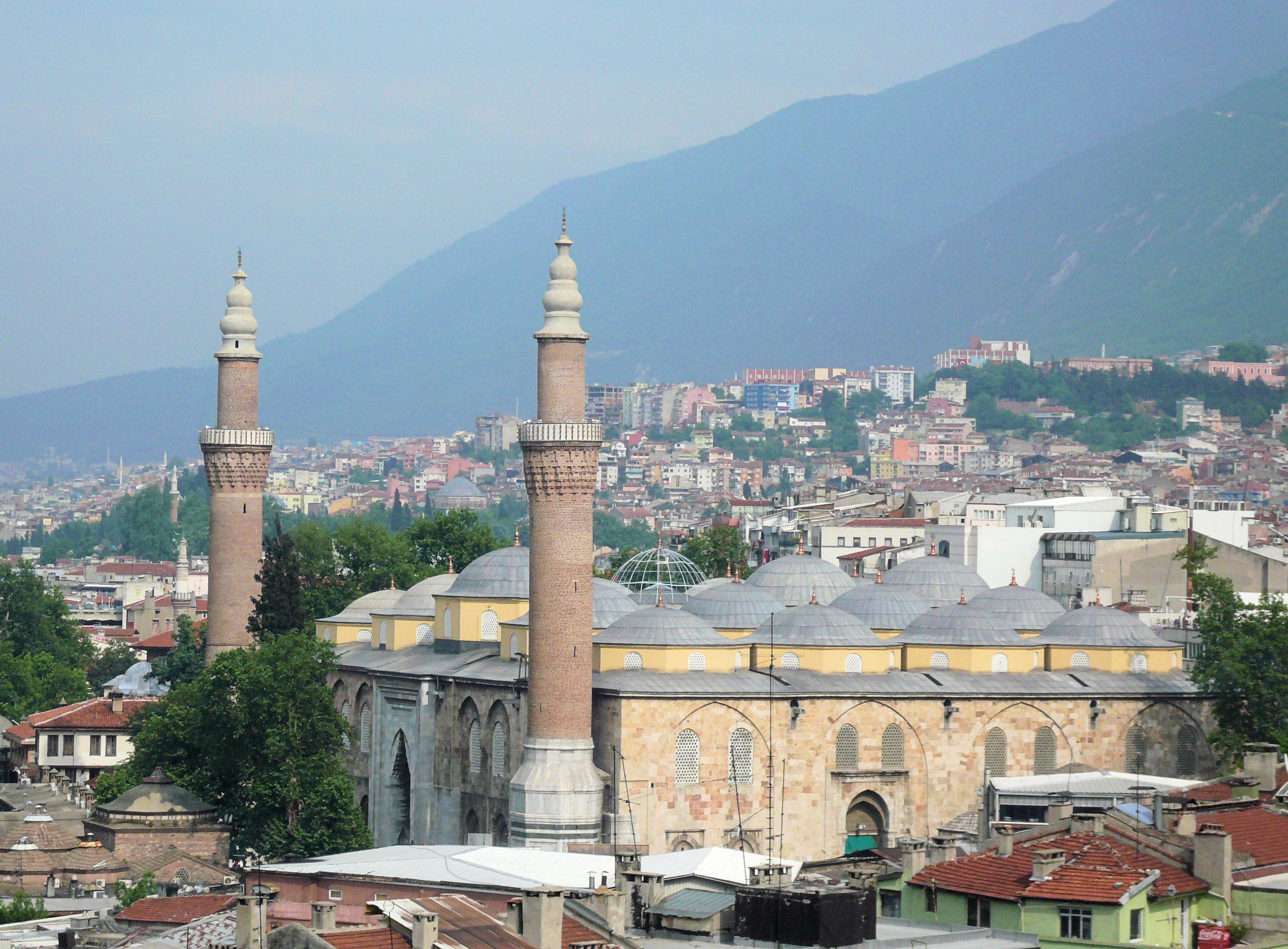
The Grand Mosque of Bursa (end of 14th century)

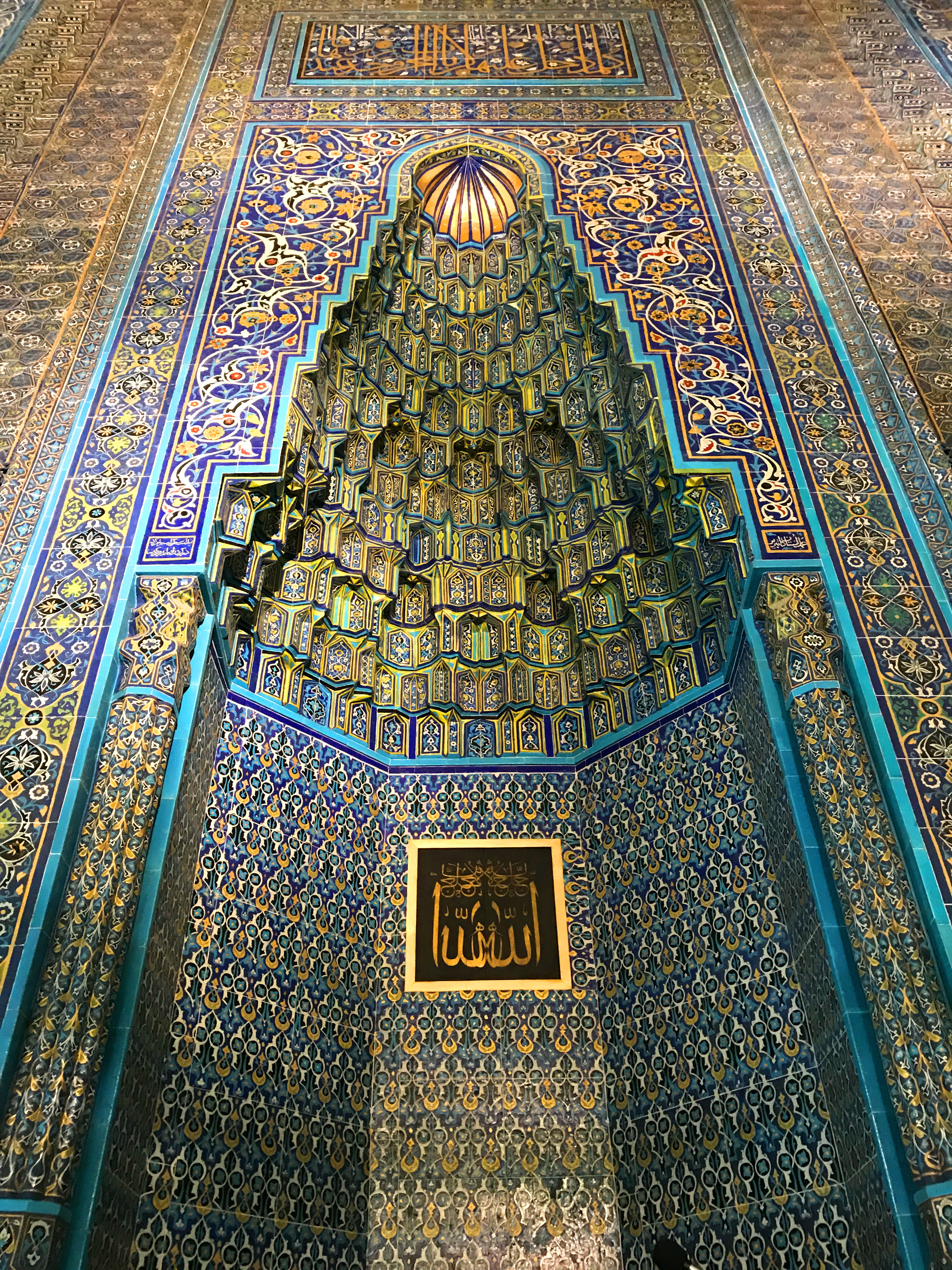
Tiled mihrab of the Green Mosque in Bursa (early 15th century)

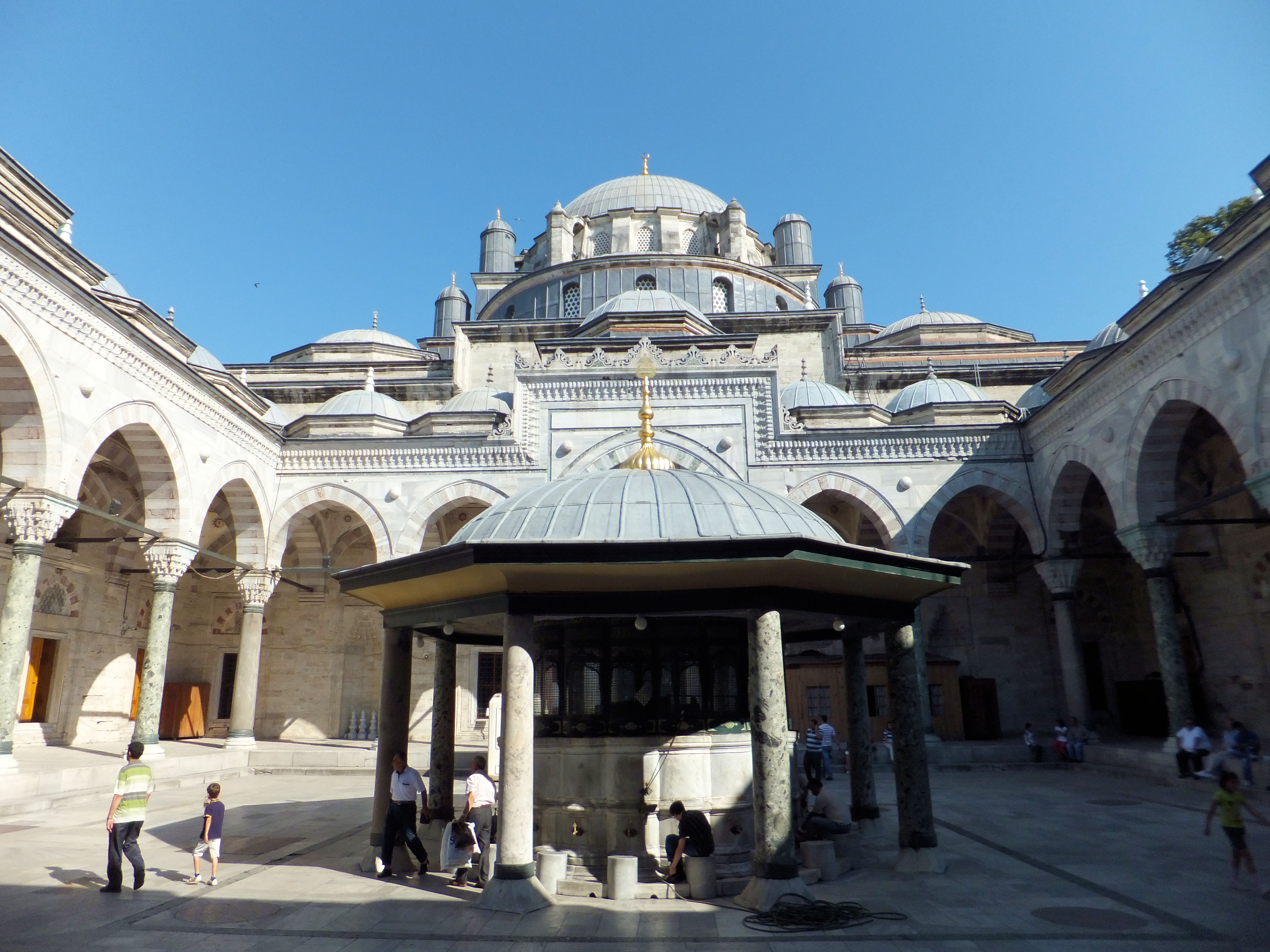
Courtyard of the Bayezid II Mosque, Istanbul (late 15th century)

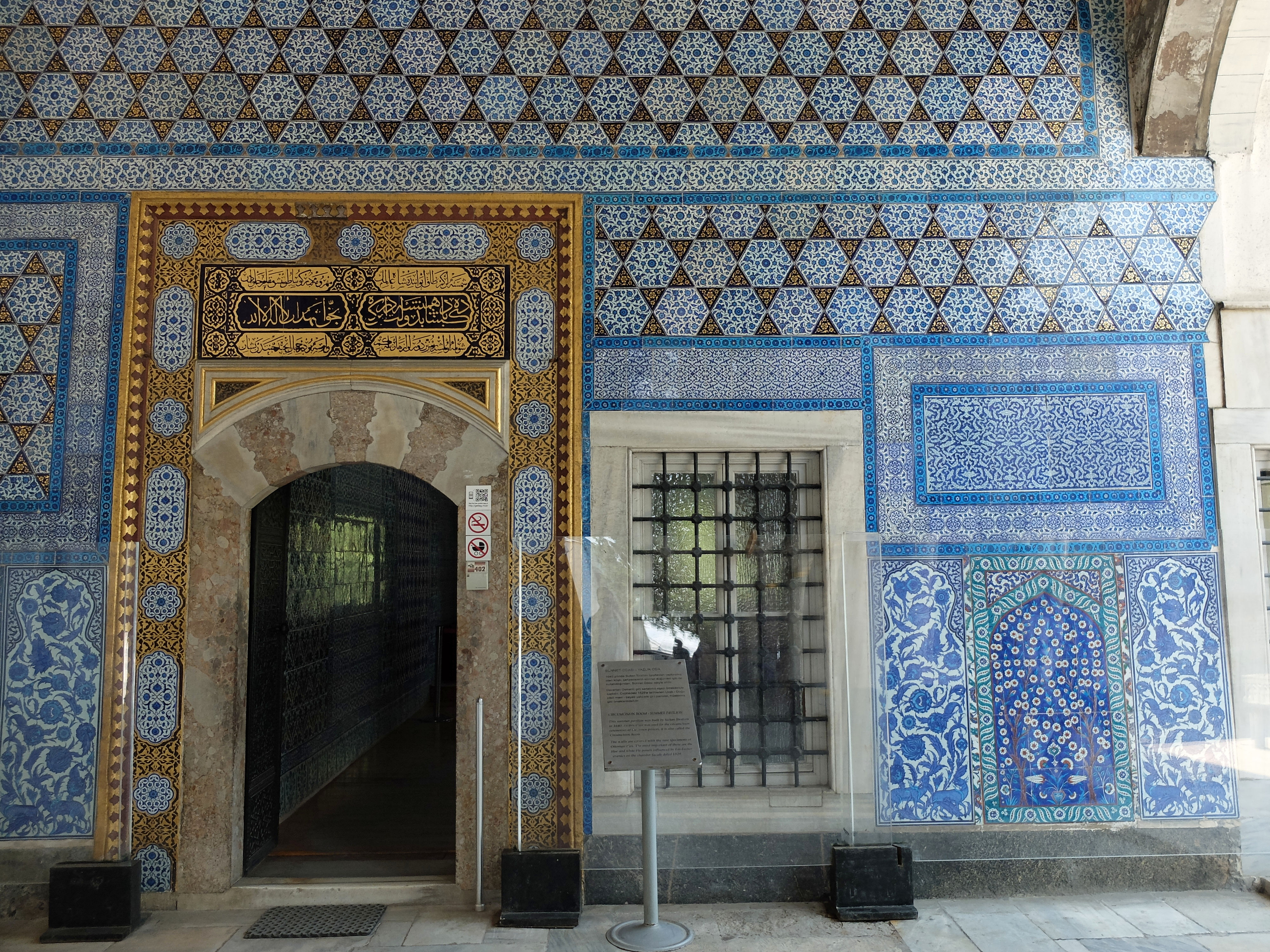
Iznik tile decoration at Topkapı Palace in Istanbul (16th century, Ottoman period)

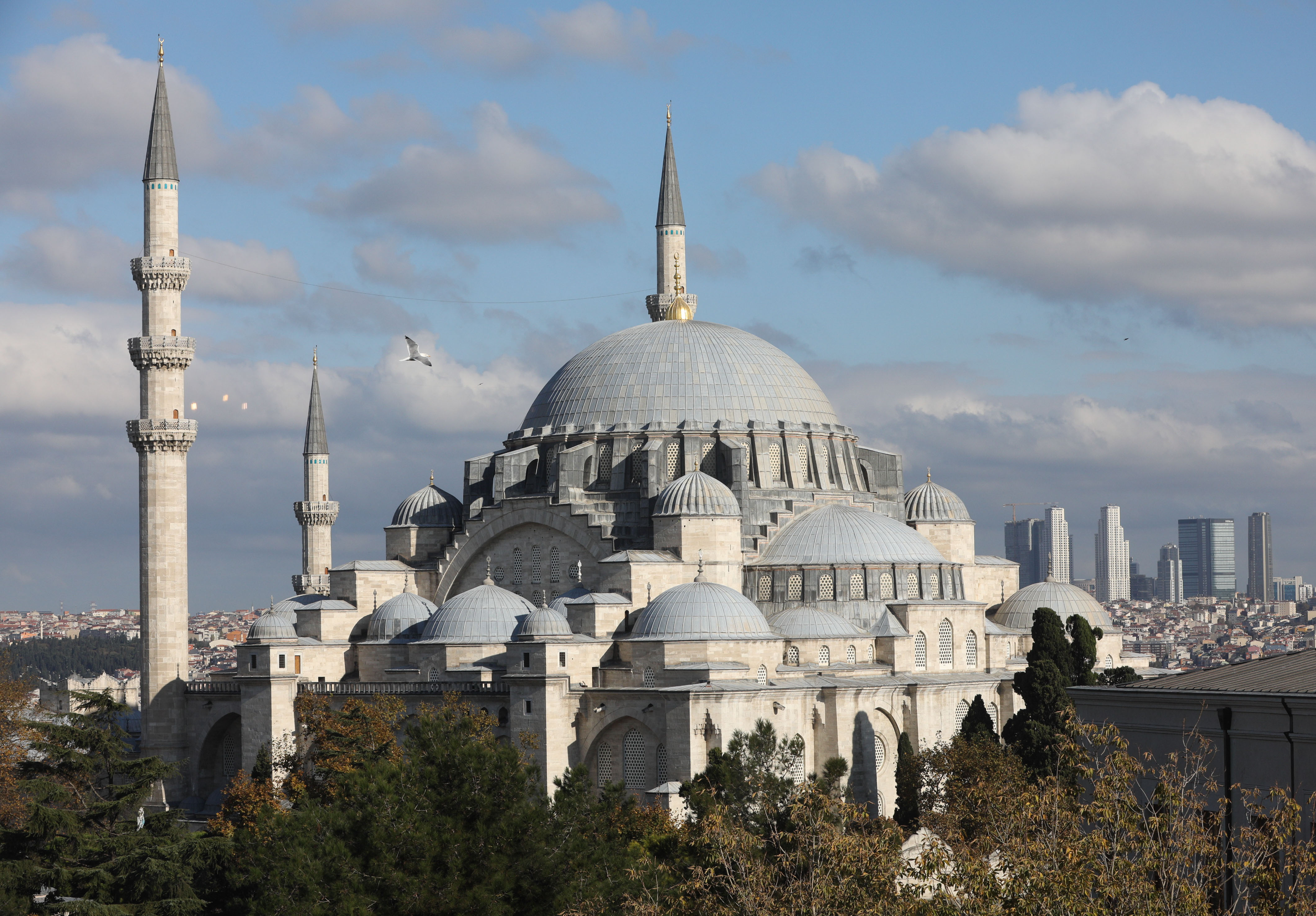
Süleymaniye Mosque, Istanbul (16th century), designed by Mimar Sinan

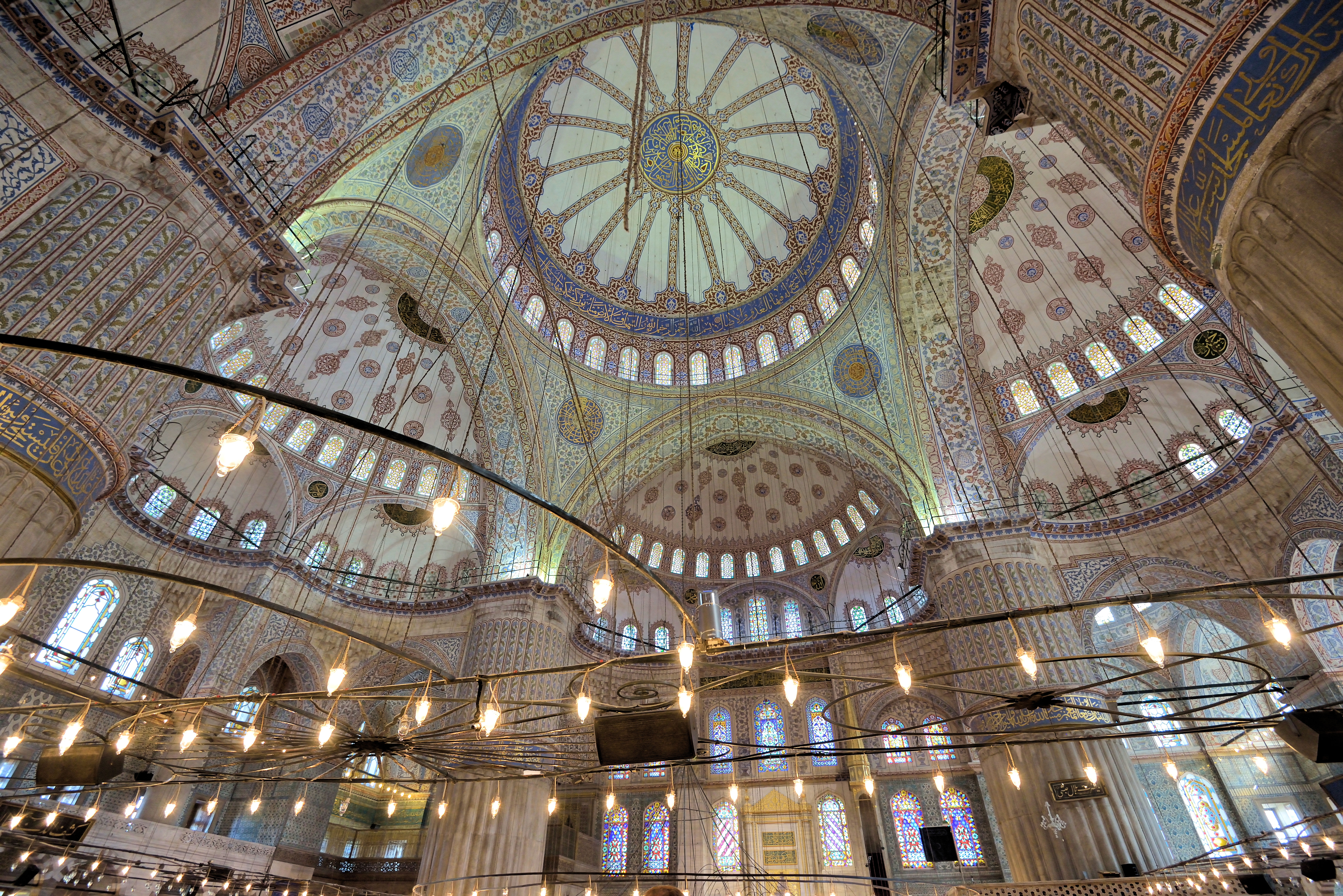
Interior of Sultan Ahmed Mosque, Istanbul (early 17th century)

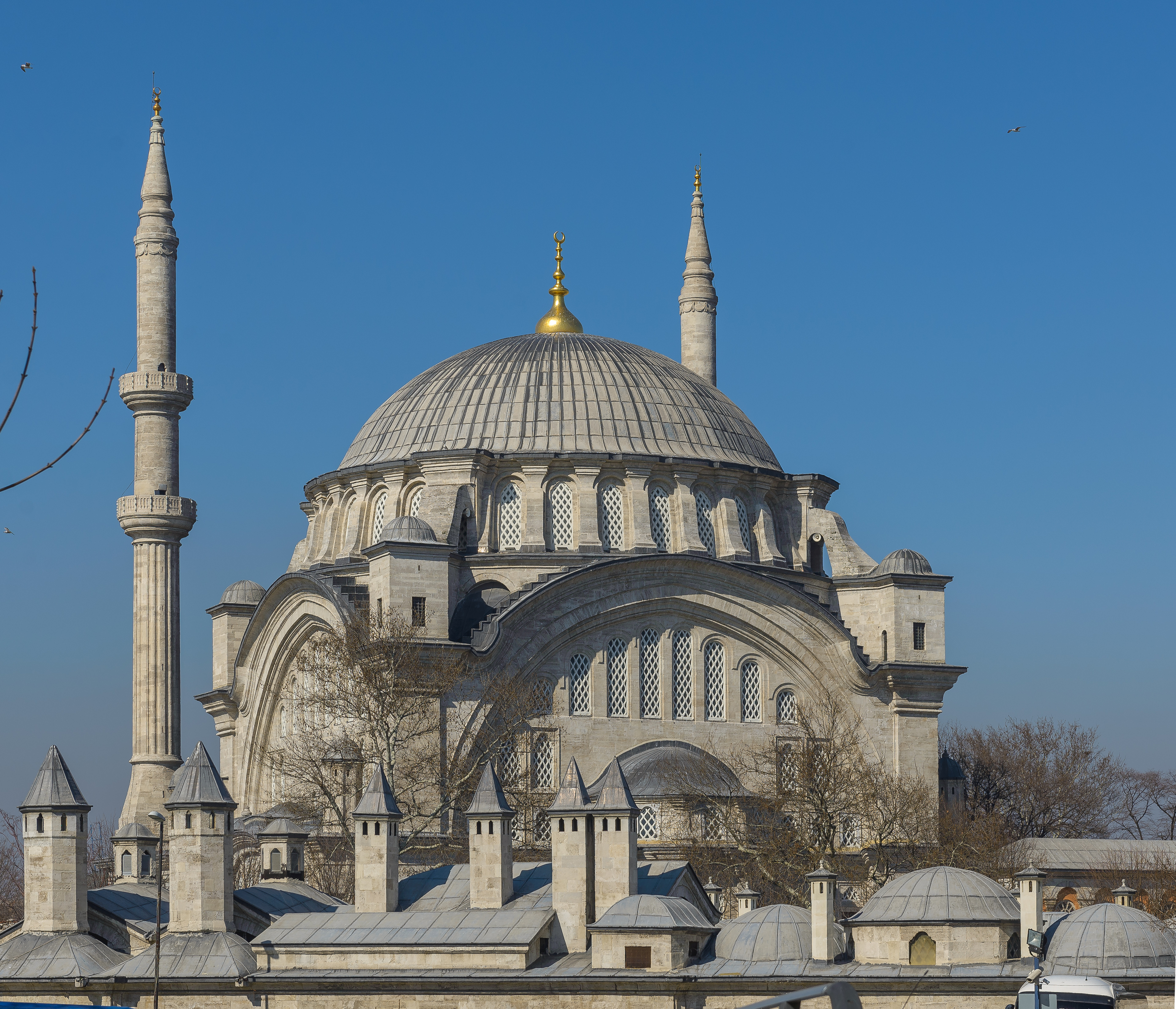
Nuruosmaniye Mosque, Istanbul (mid-18th century), an example of the Ottoman Baroque style

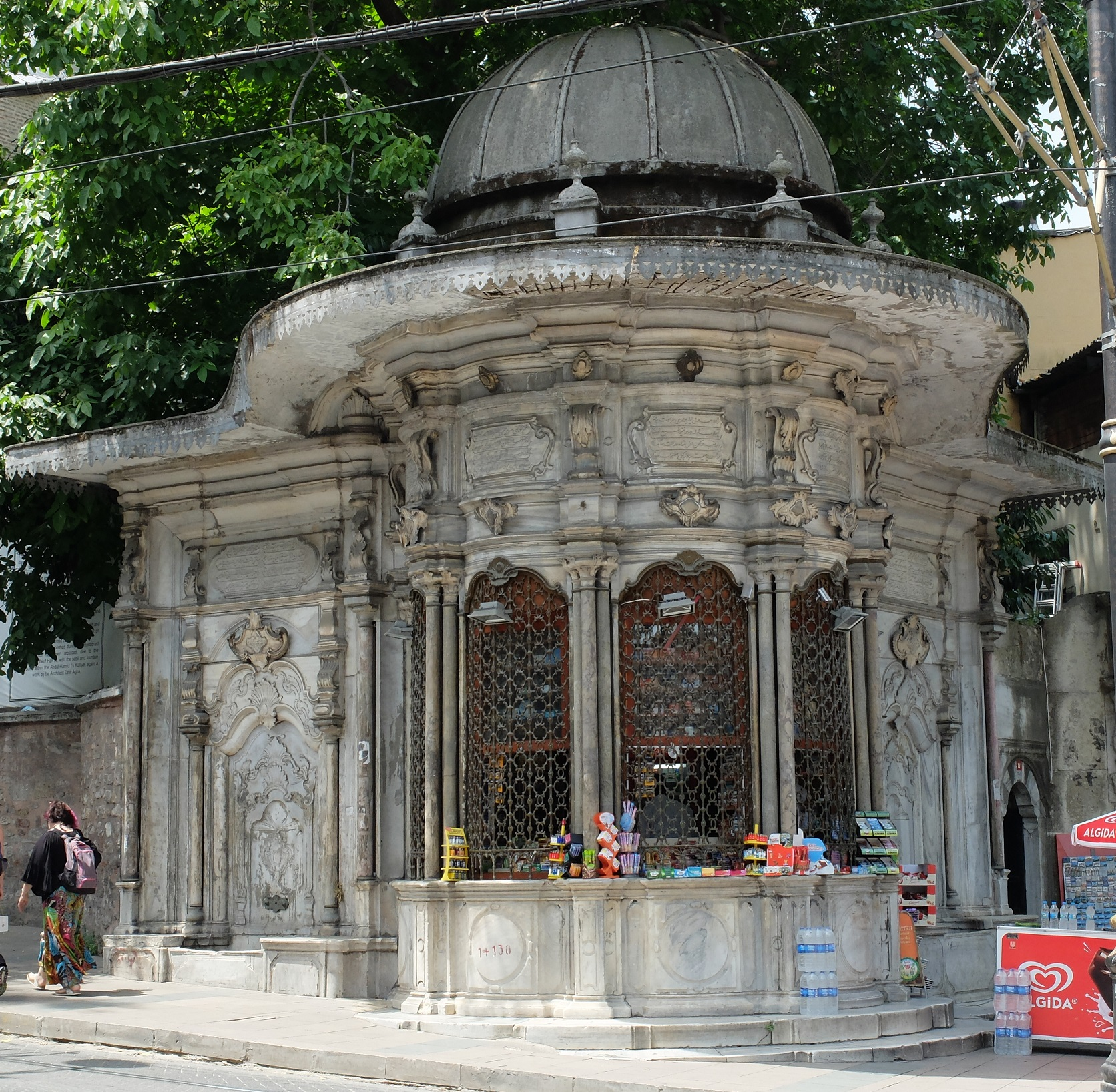
The sebil of Abdülhamid I, Istanbul (late 18th century)

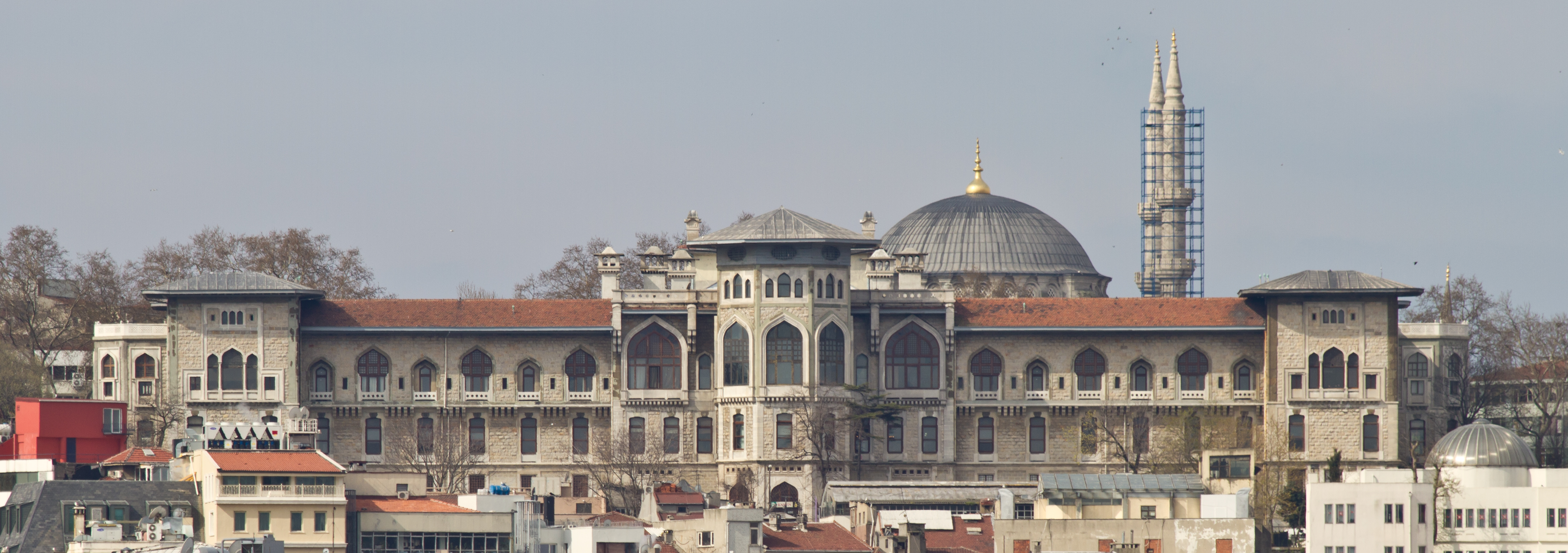
Istanbul High School (19th century)

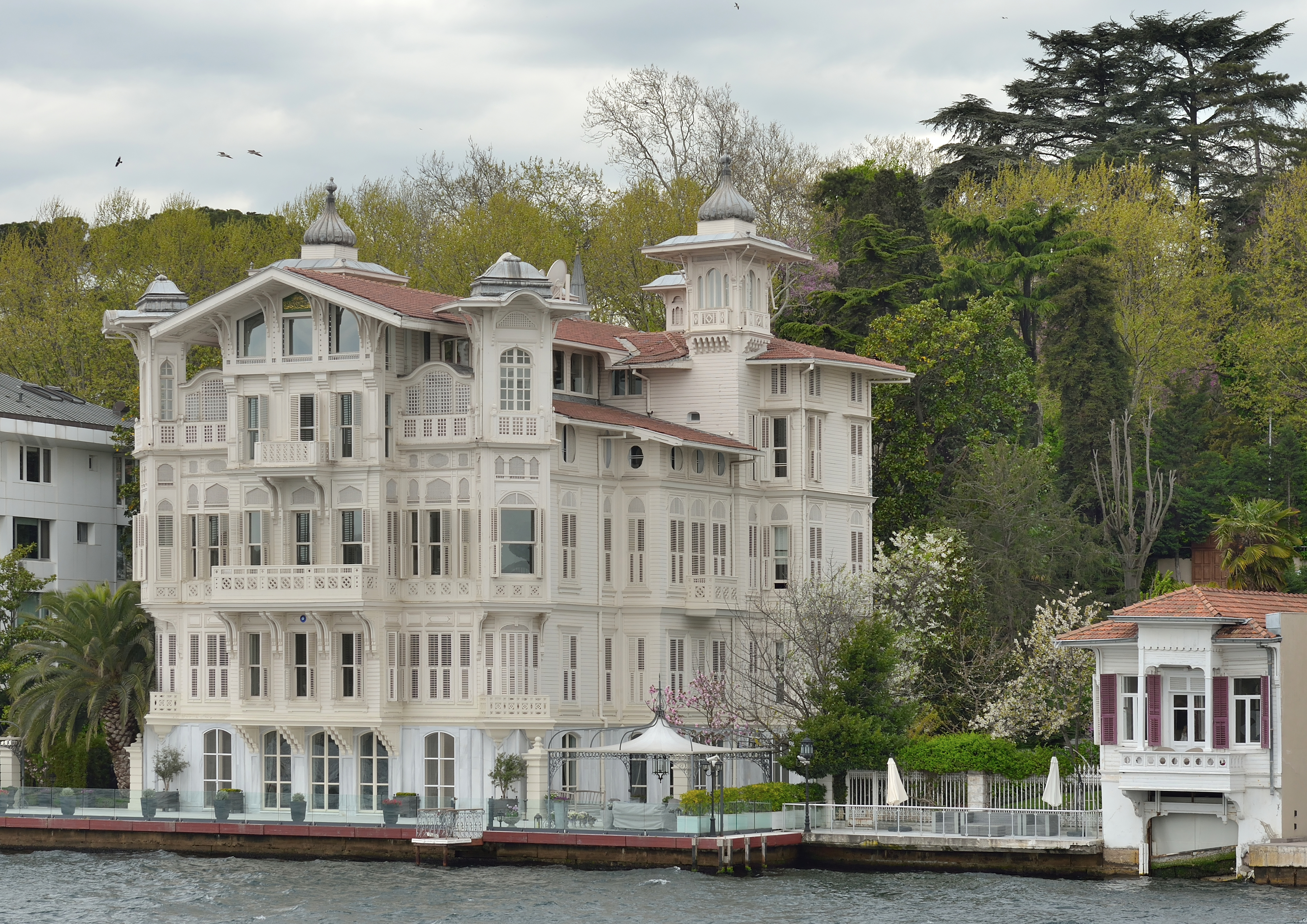
A historic yalı, a residence constructed along the shores of the Bosphorus near Istanbul

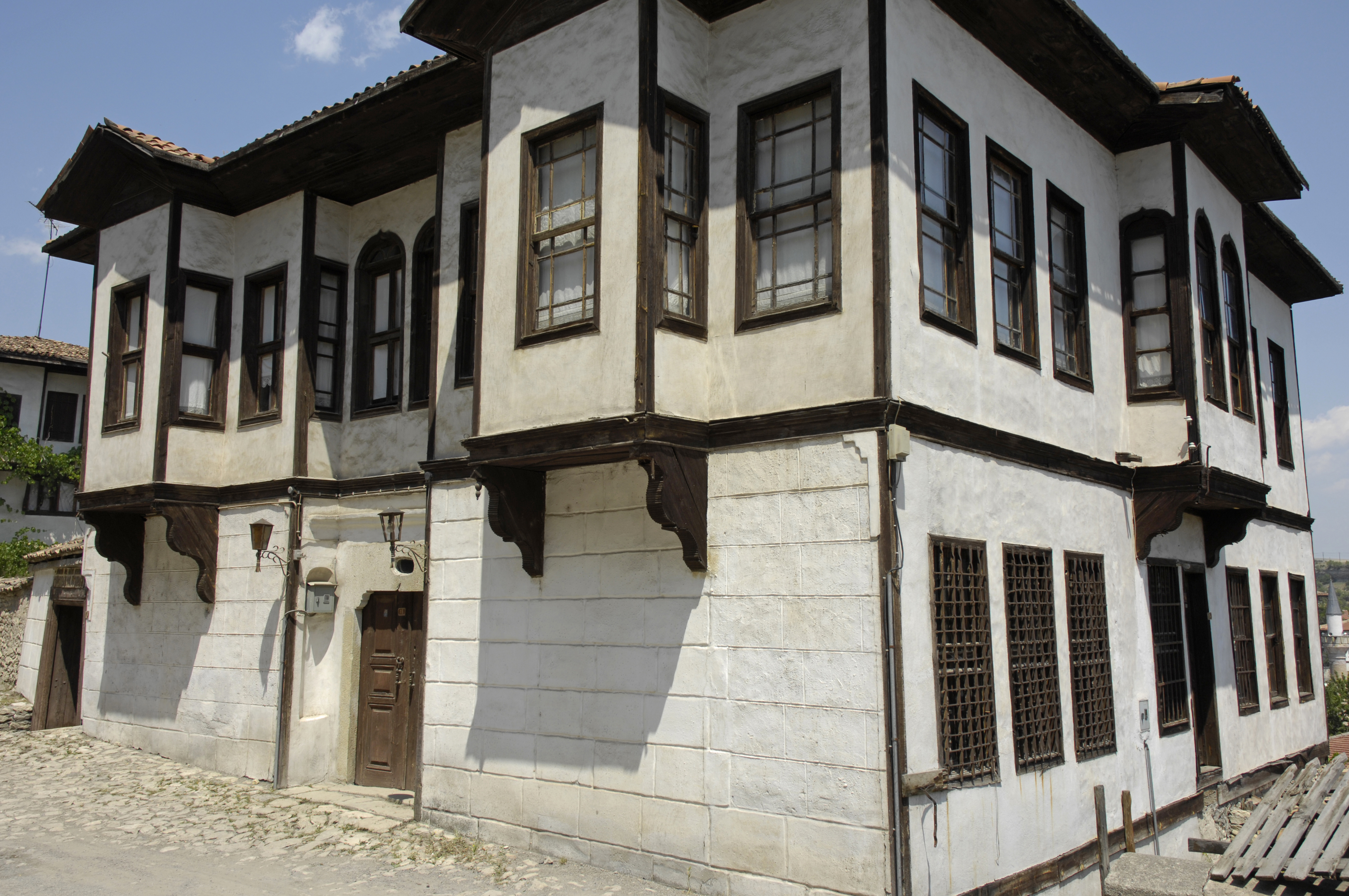
Traditional Ottoman domestic architecture in Safranbolu

=== Iberian Peninsula and western North Africa ===
The architectural style which developed in the westernmost territories of the historic Muslim world is often referred to as "Moorish architecture", though scholars often refer to it as "Western Islamic architecture" or "architecture of the Islamic west". This architectural style developed primarily in al-Andalus (present-day Spain and Portugal) and in the Maghreb (mostly present-day Morocco, Algeria, and Tunisia). Its most recognizable features include the horseshoe arch, riad gardens (symmetrically divided courtyard gardens), and elaborate geometric and arabesque motifs in wood, stucco, and tilework (notably zellij). Major centers of this artistic development included the main capitals of the empires and Muslim states in the region's history, such as Cordoba, Kairouan, Fes, Marrakesh, Seville, Granada and Tlemcen. Among the best-known monuments from these areas are the Great Mosque of Kairouan, the Great Mosque of Cordoba, the palace-city of Madinat al-Zahra (near Cordoba), the Qarawiyyin Mosque (in Fes), the Great Mosque of Tlemcen, the Kutubiyya Mosque (Marrakesh), the Giralda tower (Seville), and the fortified palace-complex of the Alhambra (Granada).

Even after the Christian conquests of Al-Andalus the legacy of Moorish architecture was still carried on in the Mudéjar style in Spain, which made use of Moorish techniques and designs and adapted them to Christian patrons. In North Africa, the medieval Moorish style was perpetuated in Moroccan architecture with relatively few changes, while in Algeria and Tunisia it became blended with Ottoman architecture after the Ottoman conquest of the region in the 16th century. Much later, particularly in the 19th century, the Moorish style was frequently imitated or emulated in the Neo-Moorish or Moorish Revival style which emerged in Europe and America as part of the Romanticist interest in the "Orient" and also, notably, as a recurring choice for new Jewish Synagogue architecture.

In addition to the general Moorish style, some styles and structures in North Africa are distinctively associated with areas that have maintained strong Berber populations and cultures, including but not limited to the Atlas Mountain regions of Morocco, the Aurès and M'zab regions of Algeria, and southern Tunisia. They do not form one single style but rather a diverse variety of local vernacular styles. In Morocco, the largely Berber-inhabited rural valleys and oases of the Atlas and the south are marked by numerous kasbahs (fortresses) and ksour (fortified villages), typically flat-roofed structures made of rammed earth and decorated with local geometric motifs, as with the famous example of Ait Benhaddou. Likewise, southern Tunisia is dotted with hilltop ksour and multi-story fortified granaries (ghorfa), such as the examples in Medenine and Ksar Ouled Soltane, typically built with loose stone bound by a mortar of clay. The island of Jerba in Tunisia has a traditional mosque architecture featuring low-lying structures built in stone and covered in whitewash. Their prayer halls are domed and they have short, round minarets. The M'zab region of Algeria (e.g. Ghardaïa) also has distinctive mosques and houses that are completely whitewashed, but built in rammed earth. Its structures also make frequent use of domes and barrel vaults. Unlike Jerba, the distinctive minarets here are tall and have a square base, tapering towards the end and crowned with "horn"-like corners.

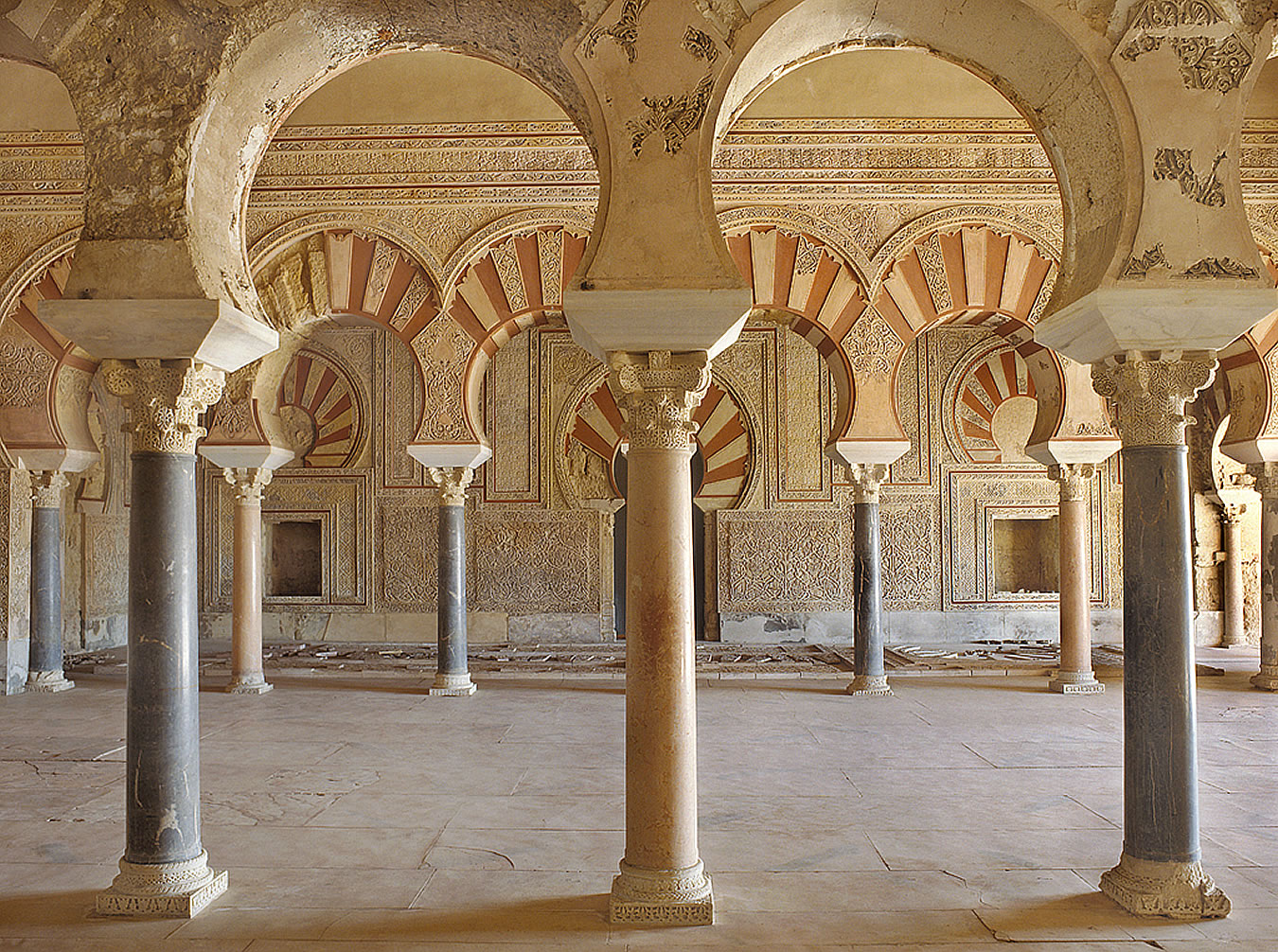
Reception Hall of Abd ar-Rahman III at Madinat al-Zahra (10th century, caliphal period)

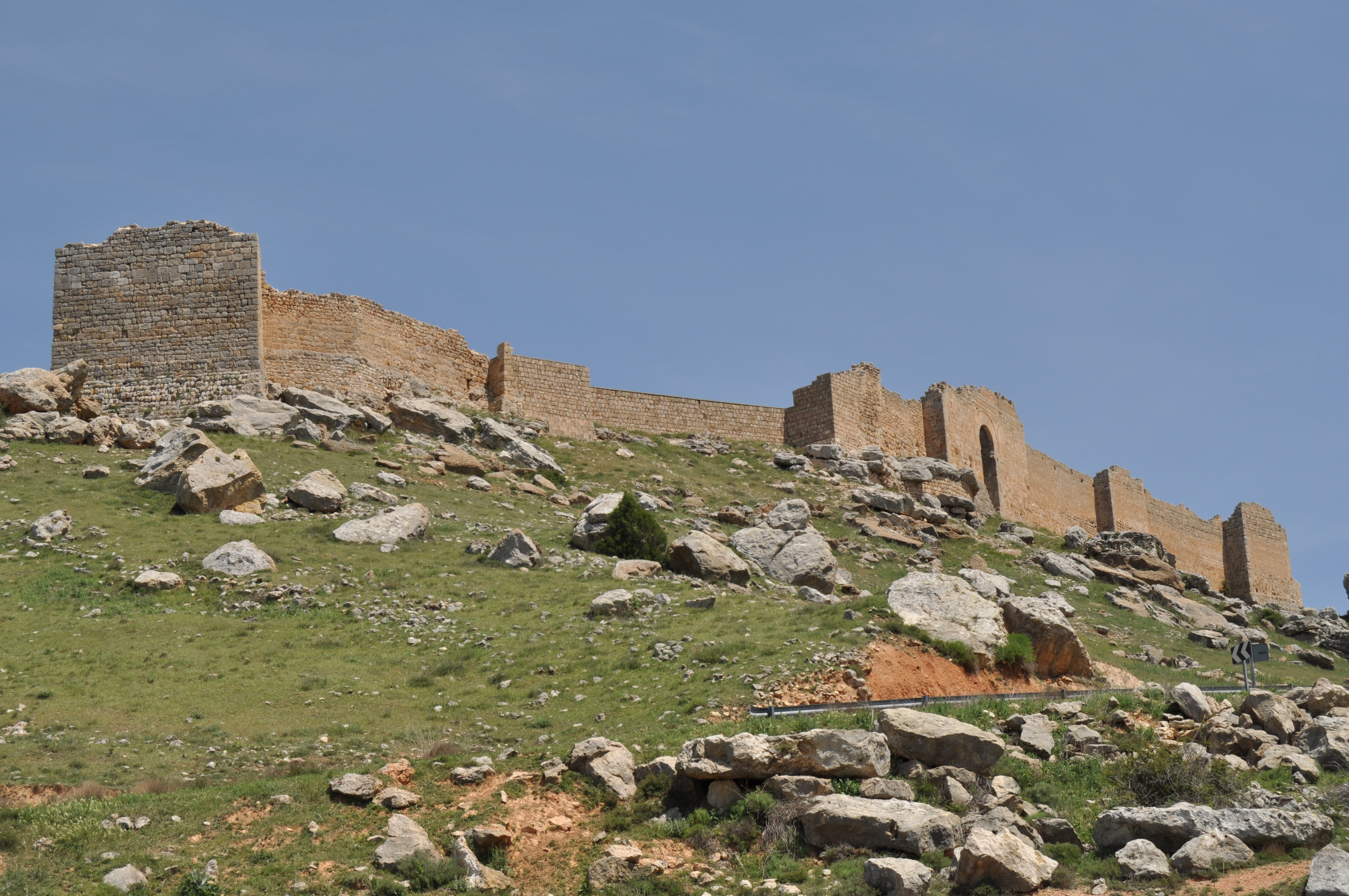
Gormaz Castle, one of the largest castles in Europe (10th century, caliphal period)

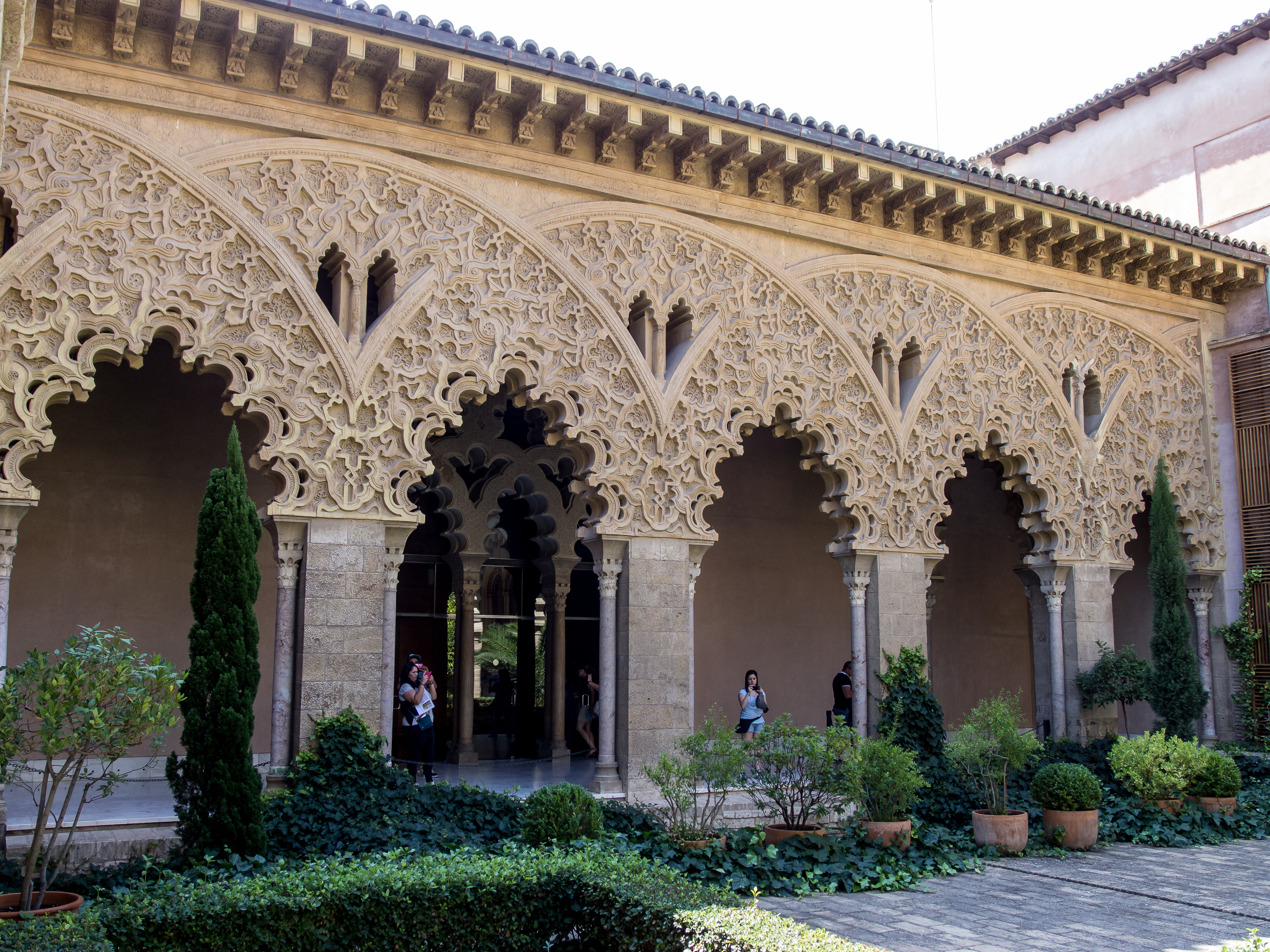
Aljaferia Palace in Zaragoza (11th century, Taifa period)

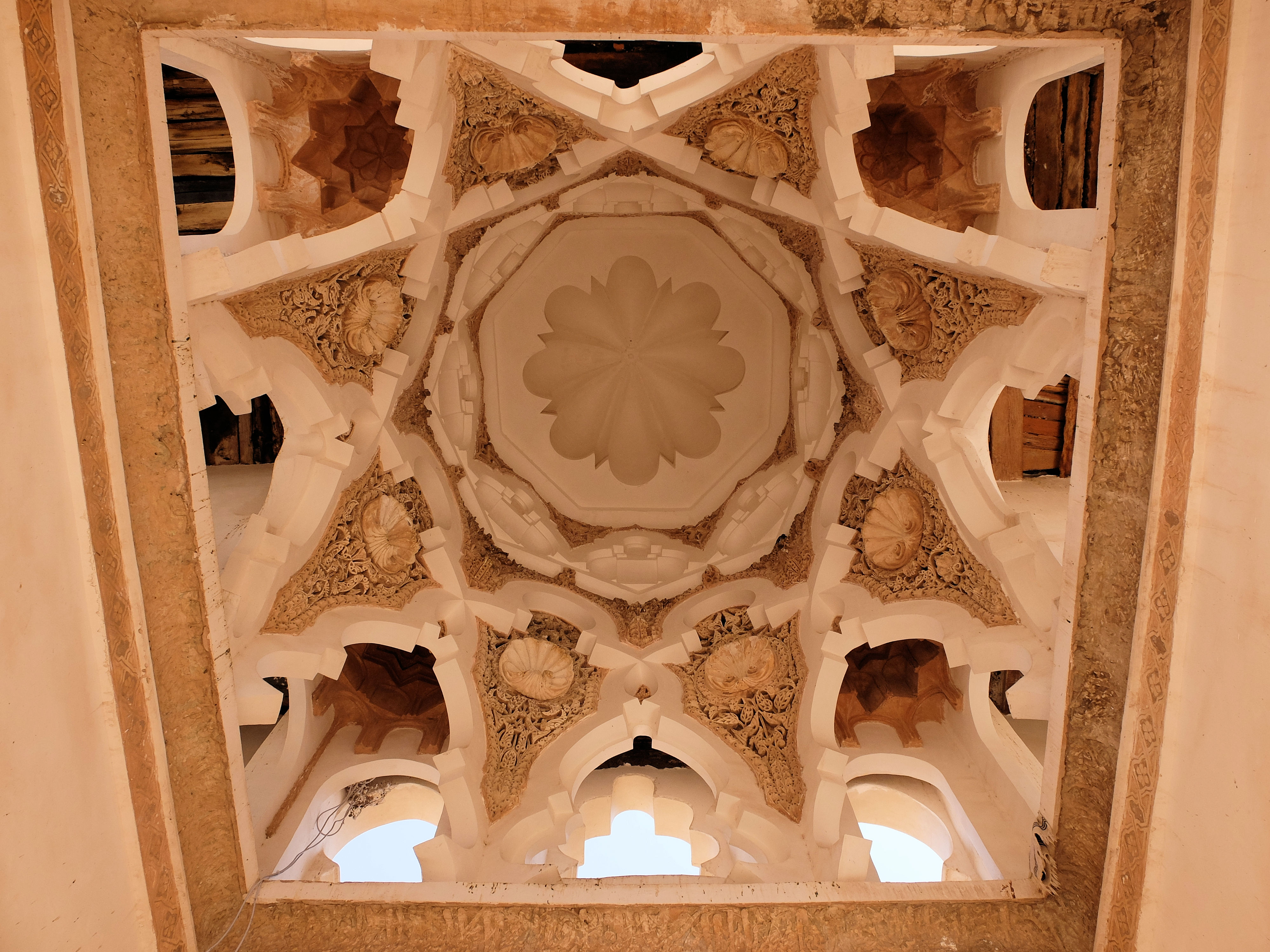
Almoravid Qubba in Marrakesh (early 12th century, Almoravid period)

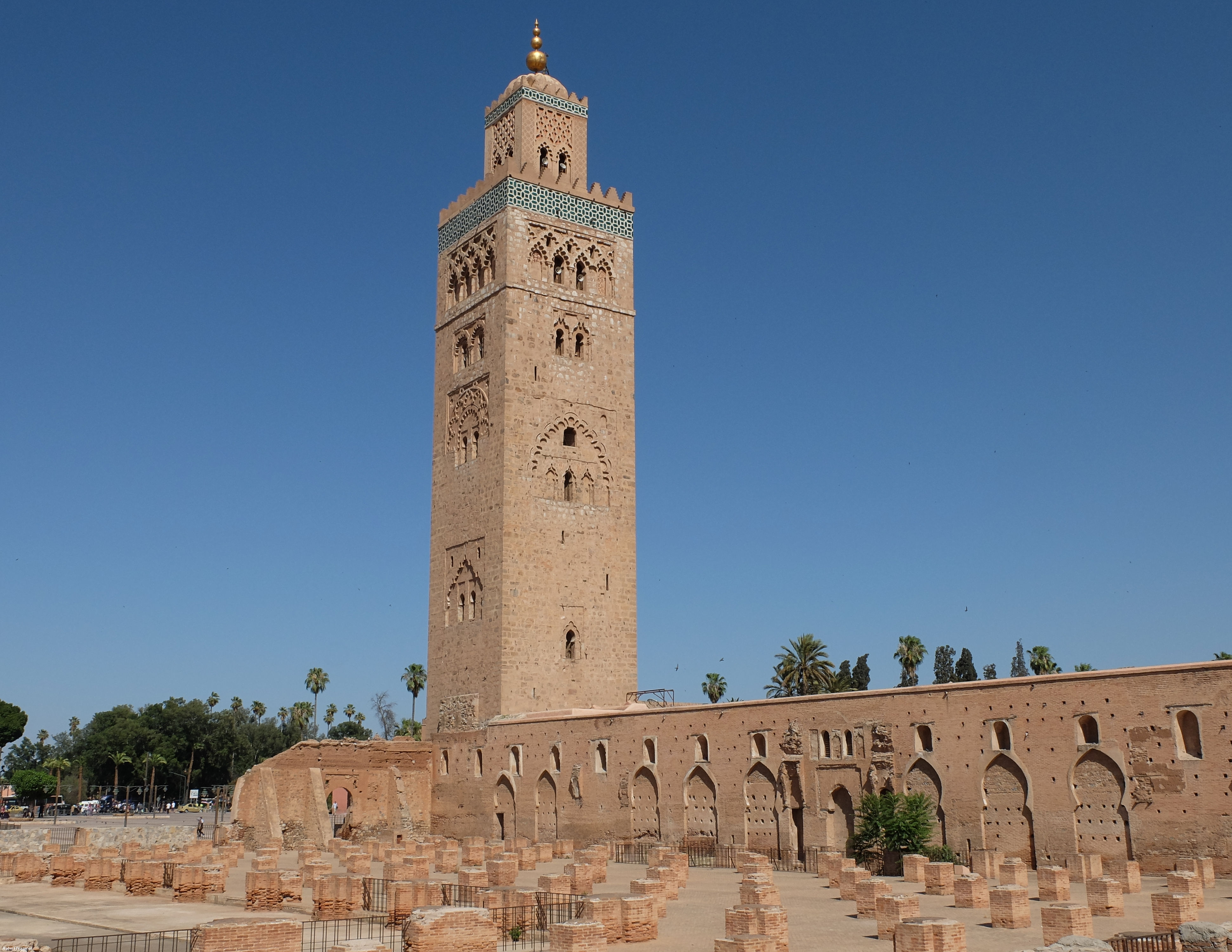
Kutubiyya Mosque in Marrakesh (12th century, Almohad period)

Giralda tower in Seville, an Almohad minaret (12th century) converted into a Christian bell tower

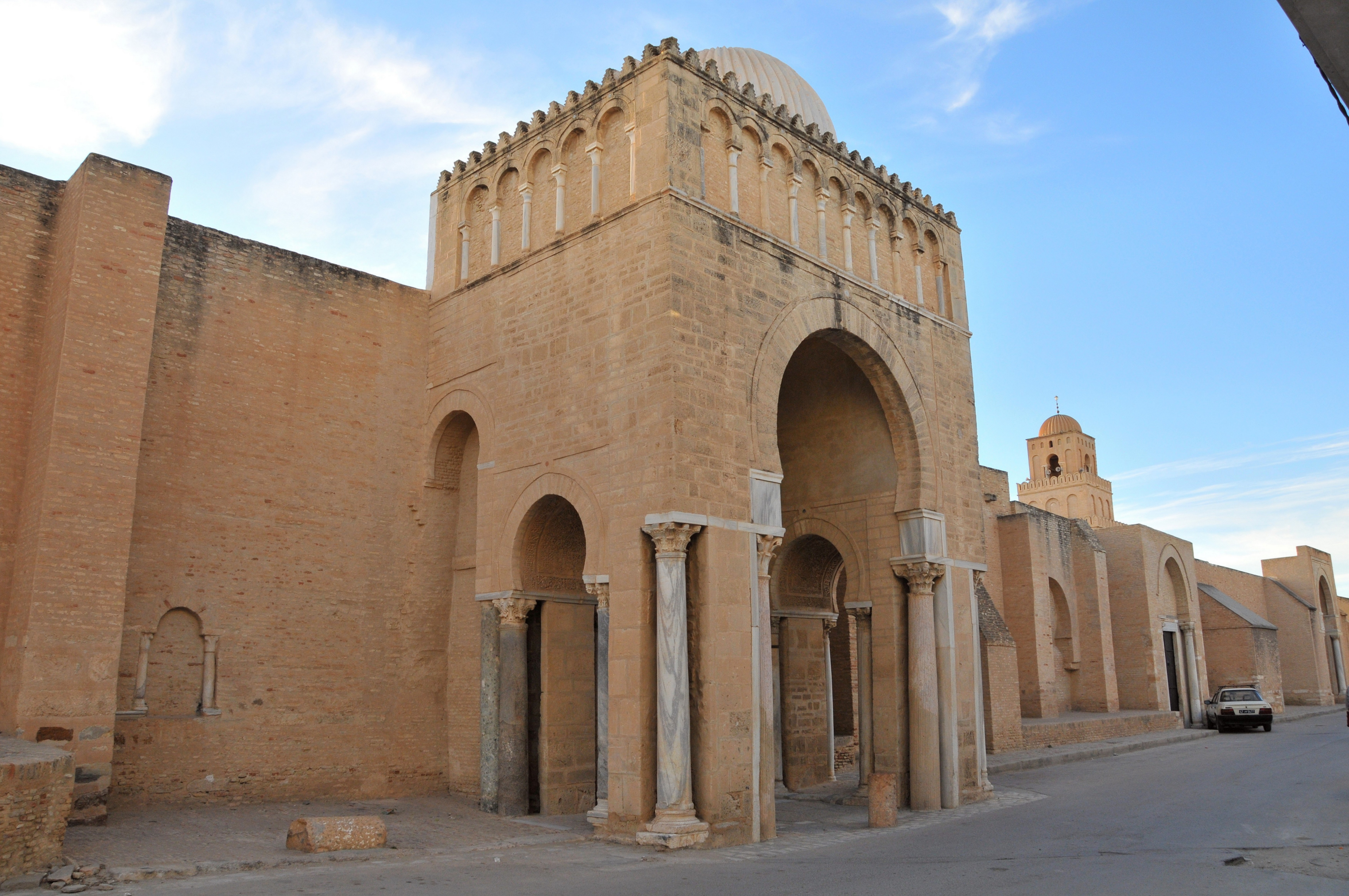
Bab Lalla Rihana, a gate added to the Great Mosque of Kairouan during the Hafsid period (late 13th century)

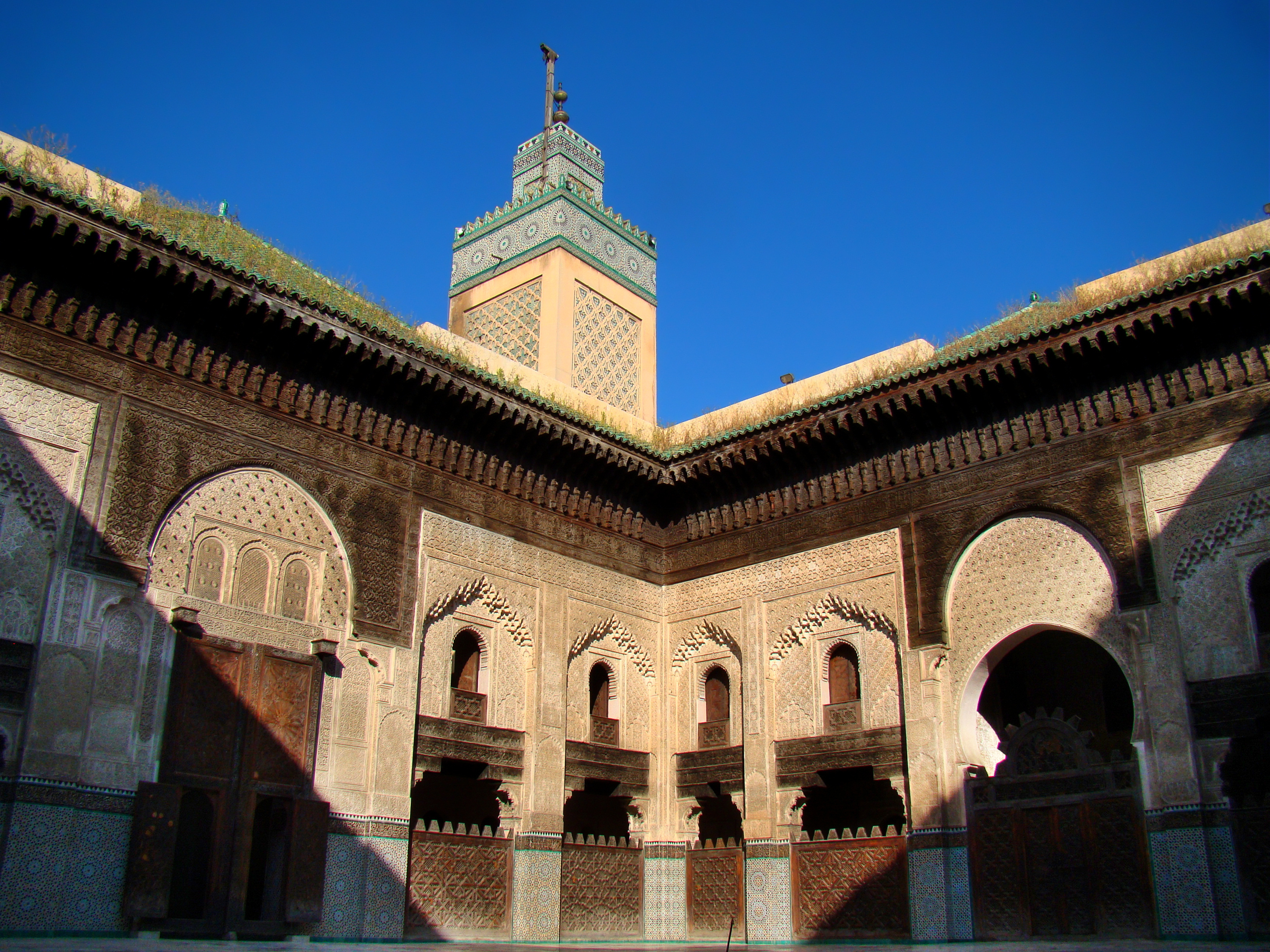
Bou Inania Madrasa in Fes (14th century, Marinid period)

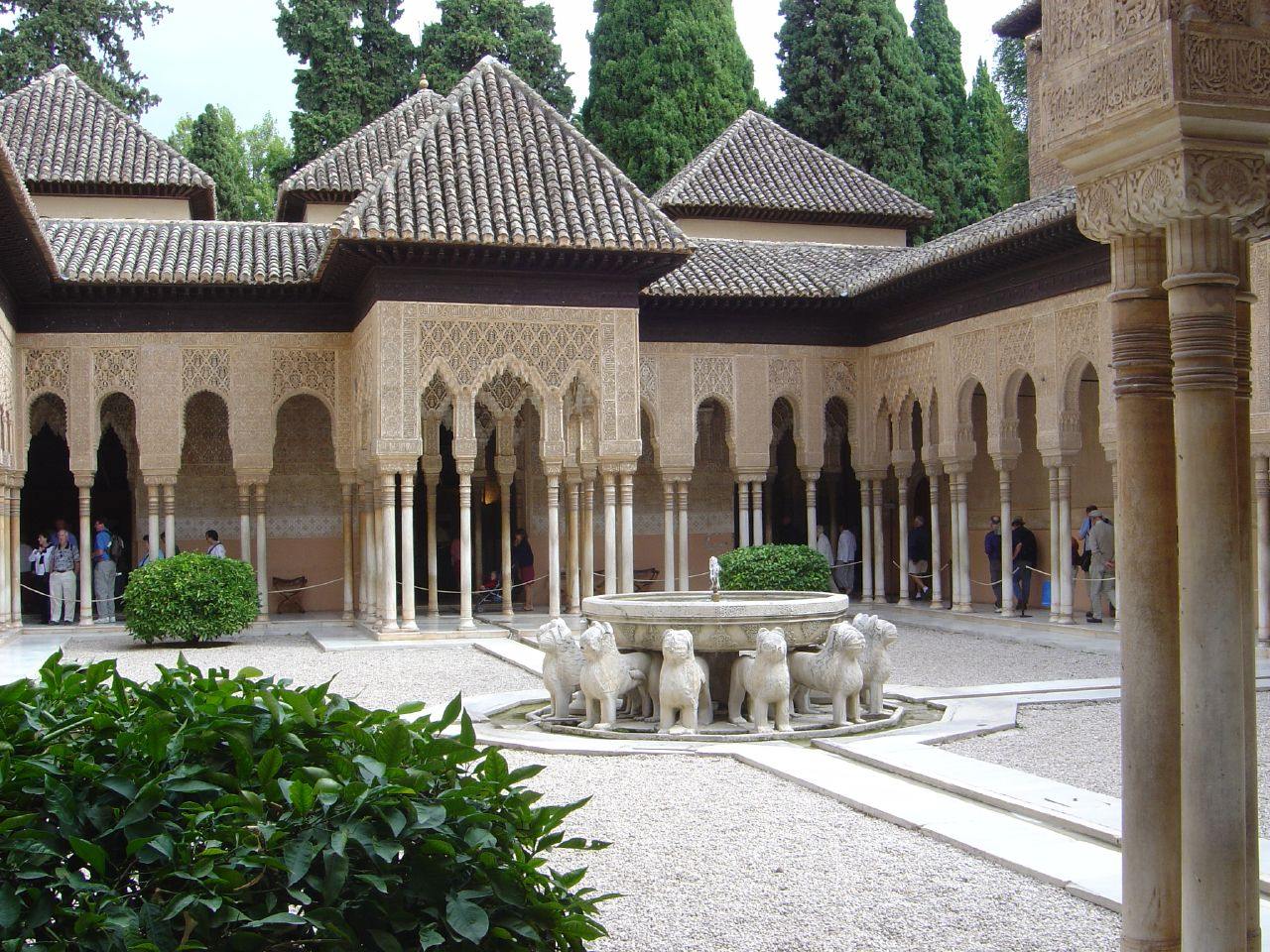
The Court of the Lions at the Alhambra, Granada (14th century, Nasrid period)

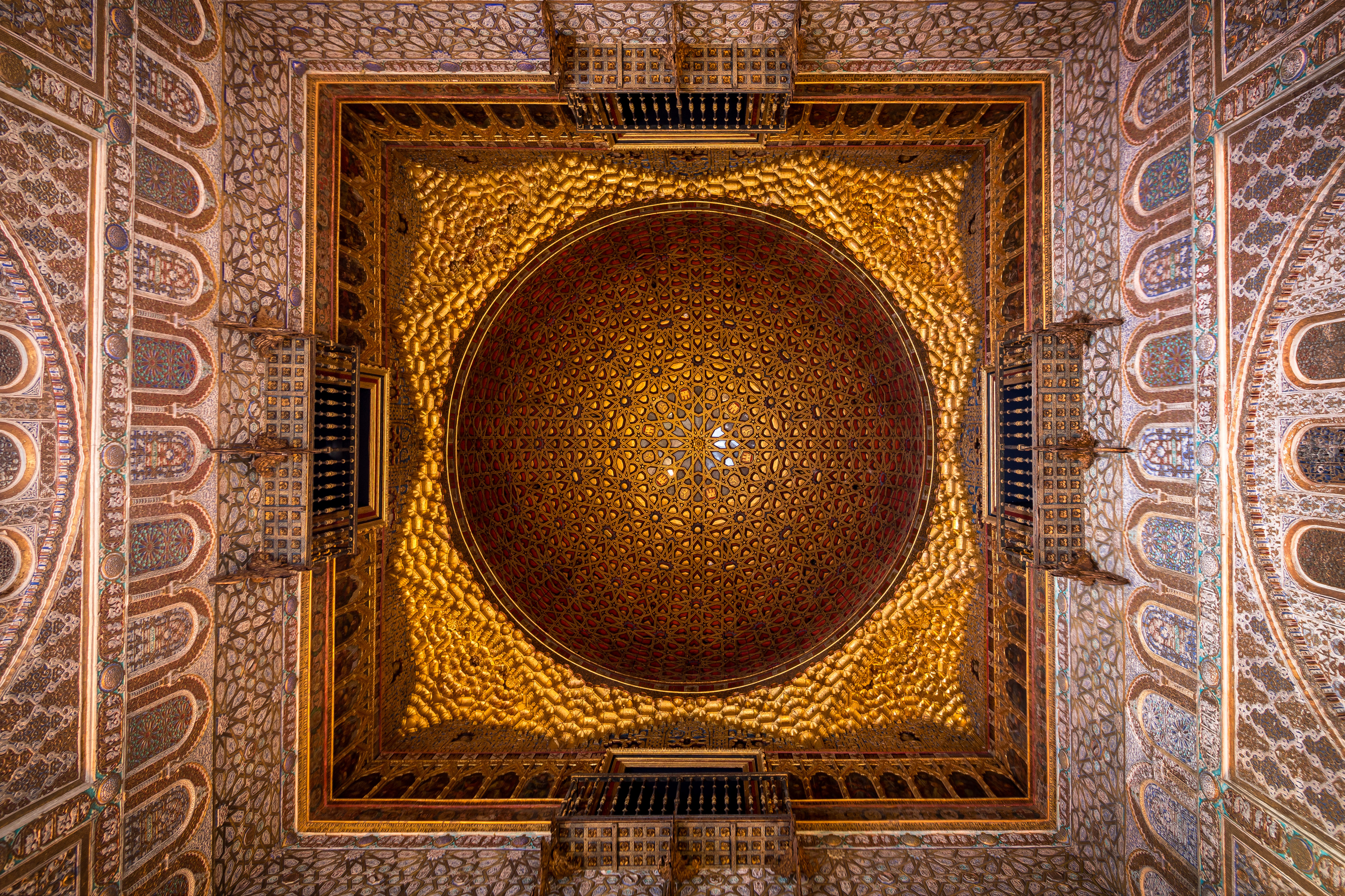
Dome of the Hall of Ambassadors in the Alcazar of Seville (14th century), an example of Mudéjar architecture (built for Christian patrons)

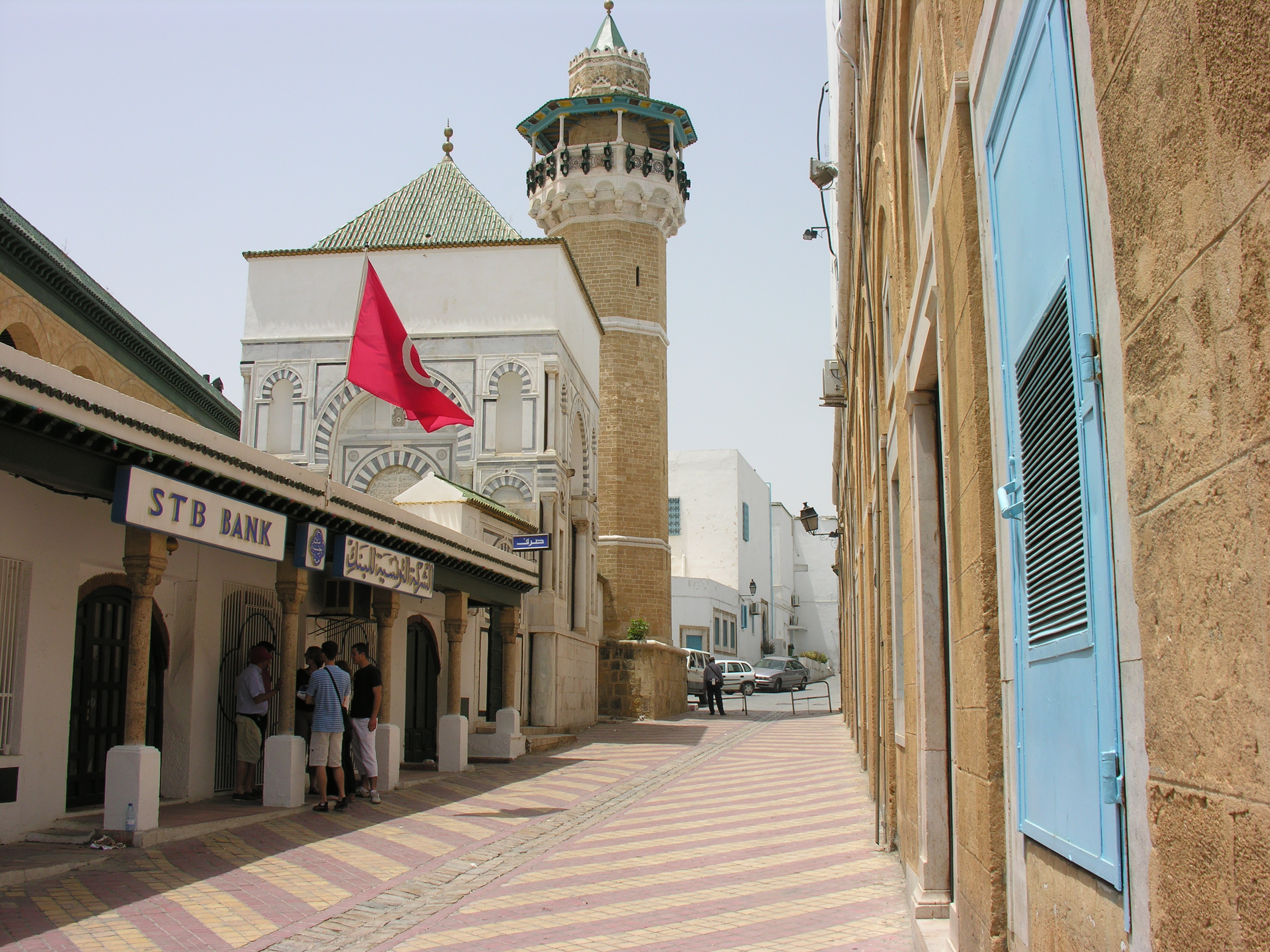
Youssef Dey Mosque in Tunis (17th century): an example of Ottoman influence blended with local styles

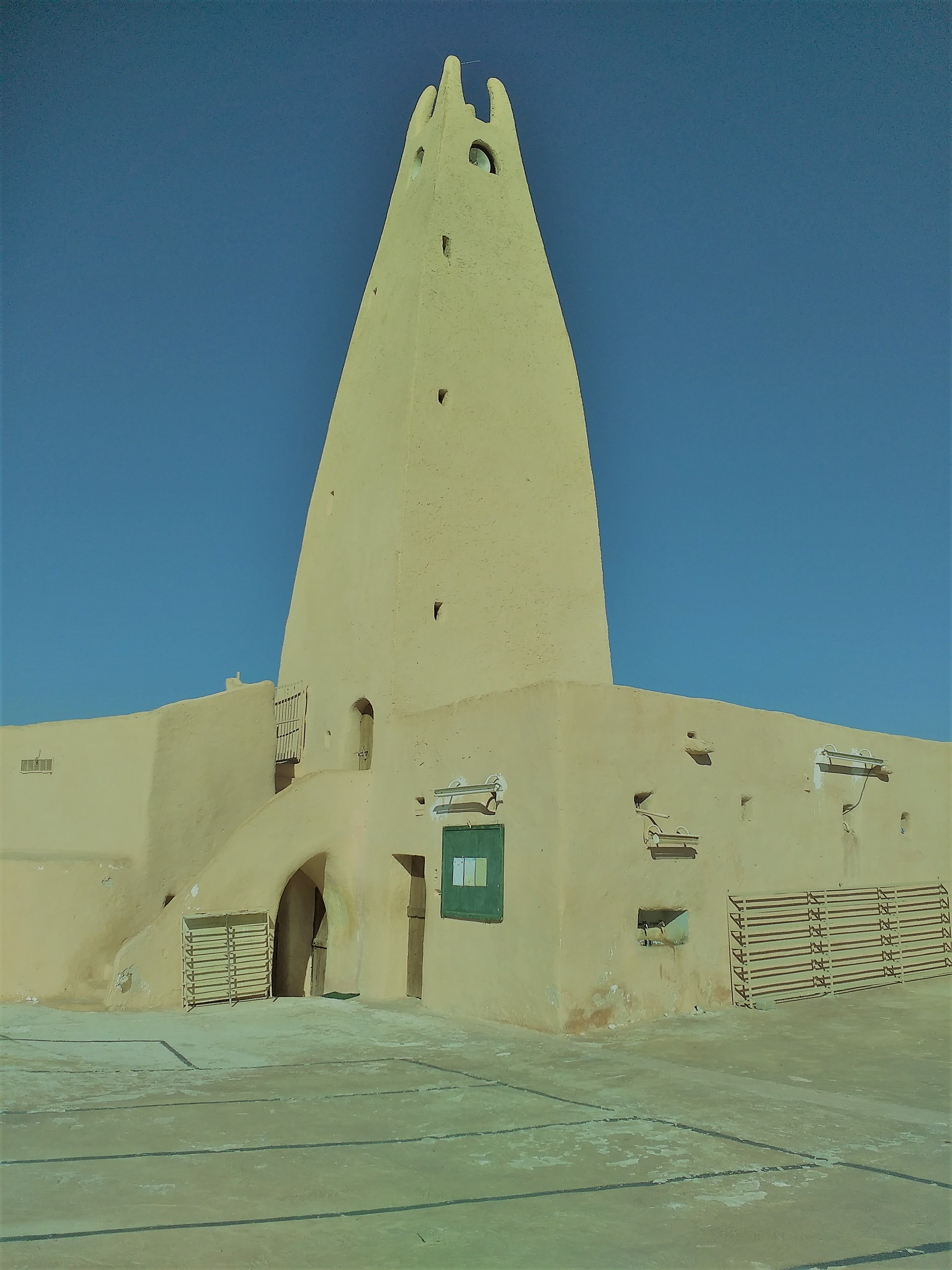
Central mosque of Ghardaïa: an example of local architecture in the M'zab region (Algeria)

=== Yemeni ===
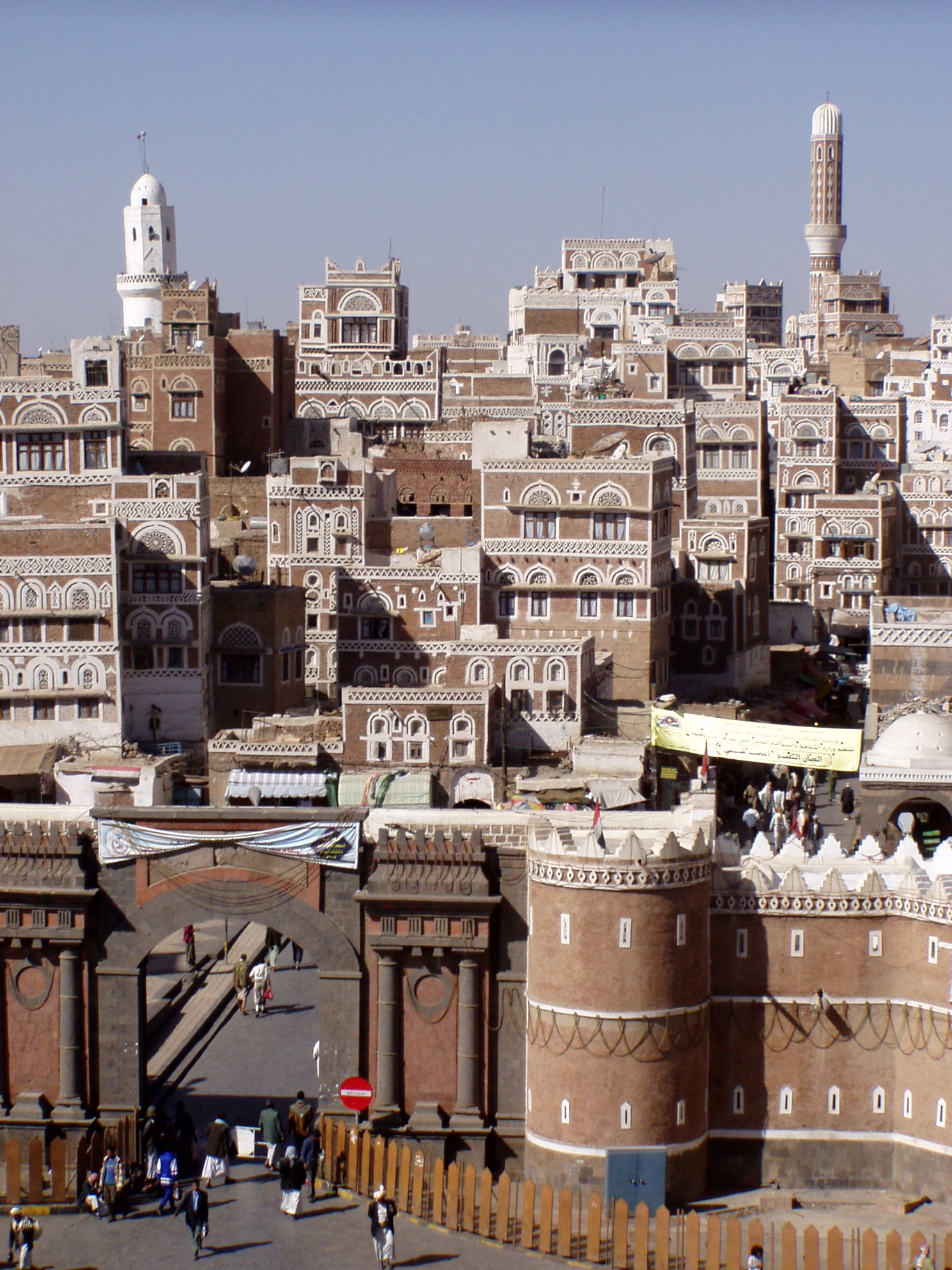
The Bāb al-Yaman (بَاب ٱلْيَمَن, Gate of the Yemen) in the Old City of Sana'a, Yemen

Yemeni architecture can be characterized as "conservative", as it combines both pre-Islamic and Islamic features. In Antiquity, Yemen was home to several wealthy city-states and an indigenous tradition of South Arabian architecture. By the 5th century AD, there is evidence that the indigenous styles were being influenced by Byzantine and late antique Mediterranean art. Yemen was Islamized in the 7th century, but few buildings from the early Islamic period have been preserved intact today. It is only from the 10th century onward that distinctive Islamic architectural styles can be documented.

One type of mosque attested during the early period of Sulayhid and Rasulid rule consisted of a large cubic chamber with one entrance, which had antecedents in the pre-Islamic temple architecture of the region. Another type consisted of a rectangular chamber with a transverse orientation, with multiple entrances and supporting columns inside, sometimes preceded by a courtyard. The hypostyle mosque with courtyard, common elsewhere, was comparatively rare in early Islamic Yemen. The Great Mosque of Sanaa, originally commissioned by the Umayyad caliph al-Walid (r. 705–15) and reconstructed at later times, was one of the few mosques of this type in the region. The mosque's decoration reflects Yemeni techniques of carved and painted wood, carved stone, and carved stucco.

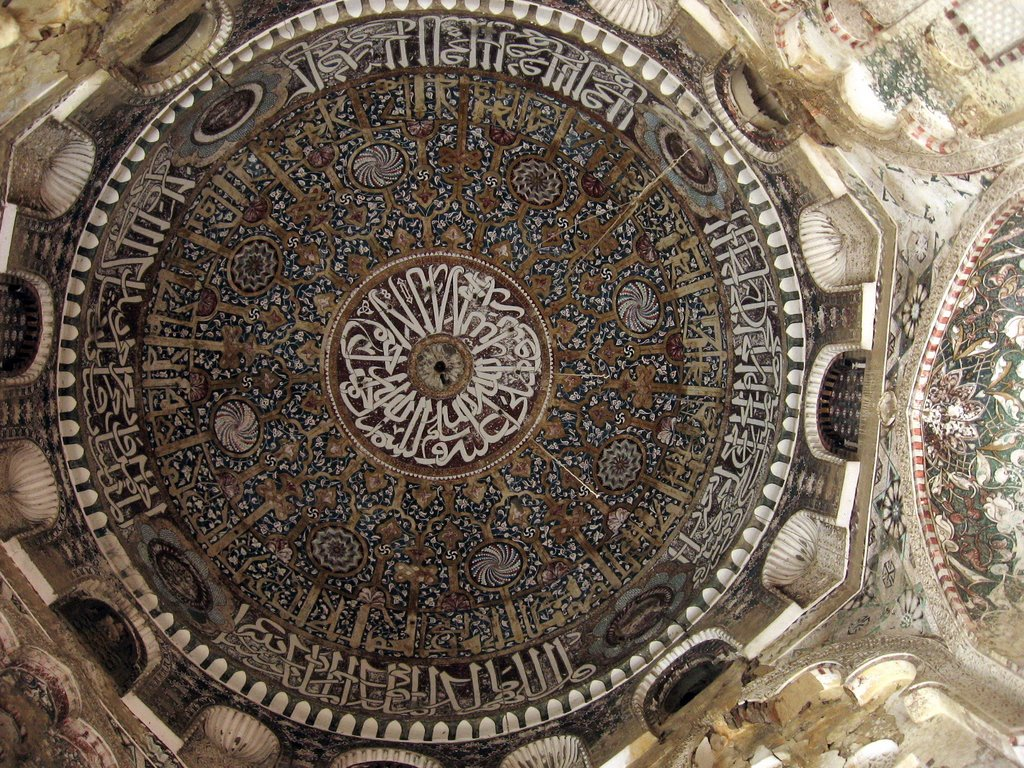
Central dome of the Ashrafiyya Mosque in Ta'izz (circa 1397)

The Ayyubids introduced domed mosque types as well as Sunni-syle madrasas to the region, but none of their buildings in Yemen have survived. The Rasulids who followed them (13th–15th centuries) were prolific patrons of architecture and perpetuated these new building types, influenced by their political links with Egypt. During the same period, the Zaydi imams in northern Yemen were buried in richly decorated domed tombs. With the advent of Ottoman rule in Yemen after 1538, Rasulid-style architecture continued to be the local norm in Sunni-controlled areas, but elements of Ottoman architecture began to be introduced in the late 16th century.

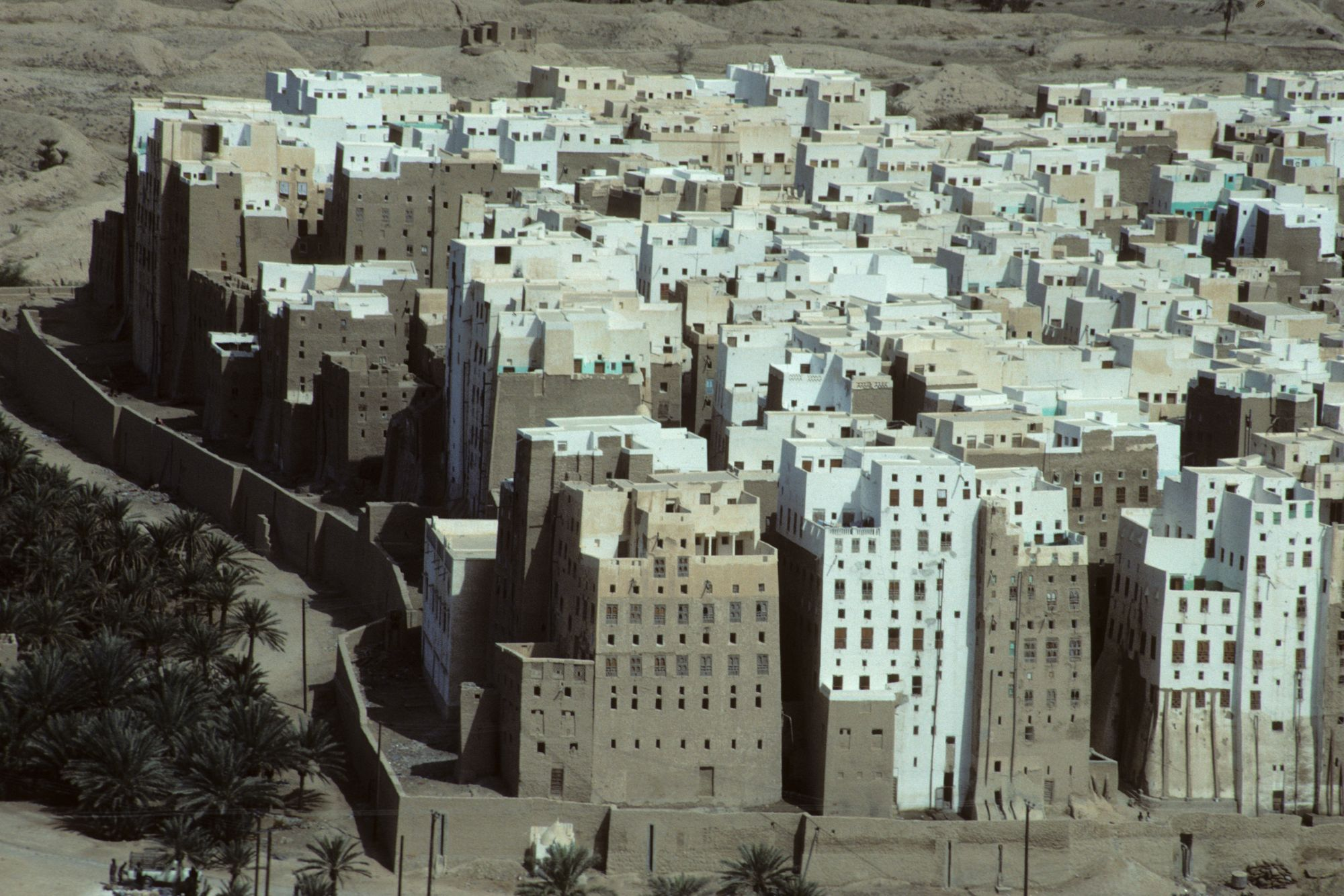
Shibam, an example of a historic fortified village

Yemen is also notable for its historic tower-houses, built on two or more floors. These houses vary in form and materials from region to region. They are typically built of mud (rammed earth or sun-dried mud-brick), stone, or a combination of both, with timber used for roofs and floors. While these structures are repaired and restored over time, this architectural style has remained generally unchanged for hundreds of years. The old city of Sanaa, a UNESCO World Heritage Site today, contains many examples. Some villages and towns, such as Rada'a, were built around a fortified citadel (e.g. the Citadel of Rada'a), others were encircled by a high mud-brick wall (e.g. Shibam), and some were built so that the houses themselves formed an outer wall along the perimeter (e.g. Khawlan).

=== Indian subcontinent ===
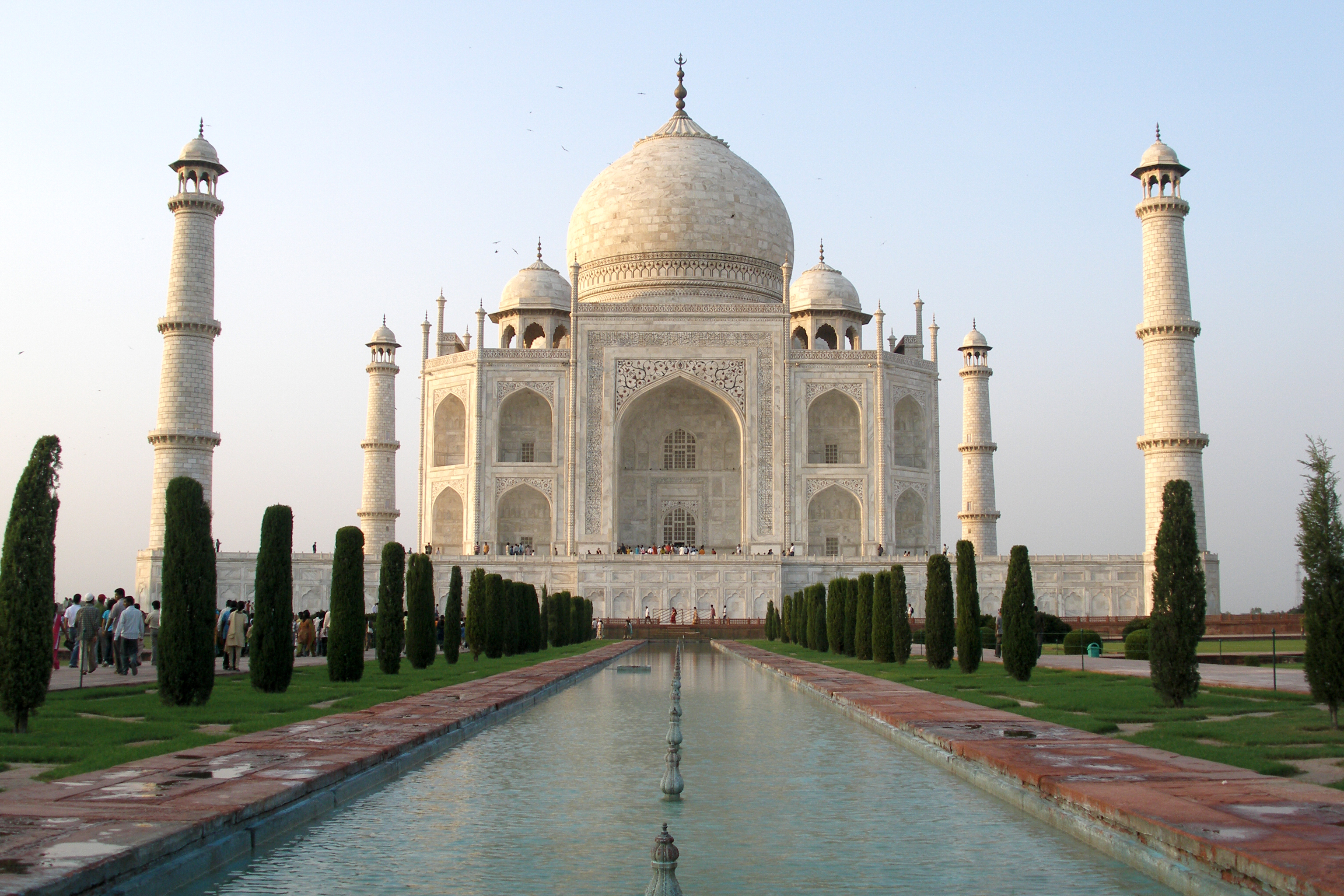
The Taj Mahal in Agra (1632–1647), the most famous building of Mughal architecture

Indo-Islamic architecture on the Indian subcontinent began in Sindh in the 8th century, where remains of a congregational mosque at Banbhore dating to 725 have been uncovered. The Ghurids laid the foundations of the Delhi Sultanate and built monuments in northern India in the 12th and 13th centuries. The most notable monument of this period is the Quwwat al-Islam Mosque complex and the Qutb Minar, which were begun in the 1190s by Sultan Qutb al-Din Aybak. The mosque's initial construction reused spolia from Hindu and Jain temples and the complex became a prototype for many mosques built in the region afterwards. The progress of Islamization in the region during the 14th and 15th centuries resulted in the emergence of a more distinctive Indo-Islamic style around this time, as exemplified by the monuments built under the Tughluq dynasty and other local states. Among other features, this style made increased use of arches, vaulted spaces, domes, and water features, while also integrating them with indigenous Indian architectural elements. In the northwestern part of the subcontinent, some notable examples from this period include the Tomb of Rukn-i Alam in Multan and the congregational mosque of Ahmedabad (1423), the latter of which is a particularly harmonious example of Islamic and indigenous Indian elements combined in one building.

The best known style of Indo-Islamic architecture is Mughal architecture, mostly built between about 1560 and 1720. Early Mughal architecture developed from existing Indo-Islamic architecture but also followed the model of Timurid architecture, due in part to the Timurid ancestry of the Mughal dynasty's founder, Babur. Mughal architecture's most prominent examples are the series of imperial mausolea, which started with the pivotal Tomb of Humayun. The most famous is the Taj Mahal in Agra, completed in 1648 by emperor Shah Jahan in memory of his wife Mumtaz Mahal who died while giving birth to their 14th child. The Taj Mahal is completely symmetrical except for Shah Jahan's sarcophagus, which is placed off center in the crypt room below the main floor. This symmetry extended to the building of an entire mirror mosque in black marble to complement the Mecca-facing mosque placed to the west of the main structure. Another slightly later imperial mausoleum is the Bibi Ka Maqbara in Aurangabad (1678) which was commissioned by the sixth Mughal emperor, Aurangzeb, in memory of his wife.

The Mughals also built monumental palaces and mosques. A famous example of the charbagh style of Mughal garden is the Shalimar Gardens in Lahore, where the domeless Tomb of Jahangir is also located. The Red Fort in Delhi and the Agra Fort are huge castle-like fortified palaces, and the abandoned city of Fatehpur Sikri, 26 miles (42 km) west of Agra, was built for Akbar in the late 16th century. Major mosques built by Mughal emperors and their family include the Jama Masjid (Friday Mosque) in Delhi, the Badshahi Mosque in Lahore, and other mosques of similar form which were often built near or within other imperial complexes. Even the Mughal nobility were able to build relatively major monuments, as with the example of the Wazir Khan Mosque in Lahore (1635), built by Wazir Khan when he was governor of the Punjab under Shah Jahan. In the later Mughal period some local governors became semi-autonomous, prompting them to build their own monuments and embellish their own regional capitals with highly-creative local styles of architecture. The Bara Imambara complex (c. 1780) built by Asaf al-Dawla in Lucknow is an example of this.

The Deccan sultanates in the southern regions of the Indian subcontinent also developed their local Indo-Islamic Deccani architectural styles, exemplified by monuments such as the Charminar in Hyderabad (1591) and Gol Gumbaz in Bijapur (1656). In the eastern part of the Indian subcontinent, the Bengali region developed a distinct regional style under the independent Bengal Sultanate, which flourished between the 14th and 16th centuries. It incorporated influences from Persia, Byzantium and North India, which were with blended indigenous Bengali elements, such as curved roofs, corner towers and complex terracotta ornamentation. One feature in the sultanate was the relative absence of minarets. Many small and medium-sized medieval mosques, with multiple domes and artistic niche mihrabs, were constructed throughout the region. The grand mosque of Bengal was the Adina Mosque (1374–75), the largest mosque in the Indian subcontinent, though partially ruined today. Built of stone demolished from temples, it featured a monumental ribbed barrel vault over the central nave, the first such giant vault used anywhere in the subcontinent. The mosque was modeled on the imperial Sasanian style of Persia. Another exceptional example which survives in present-day Bangladesh is the Sat Gumbaz ("Sixty-Dome") Mosque in Bagerhat (c. 1450). Later, a provincial style influenced by North India evolved in Mughal Bengal during the 17th and 18th centuries. The Mughals also copied the Bengali do-chala roof tradition for mausoleums in North India.

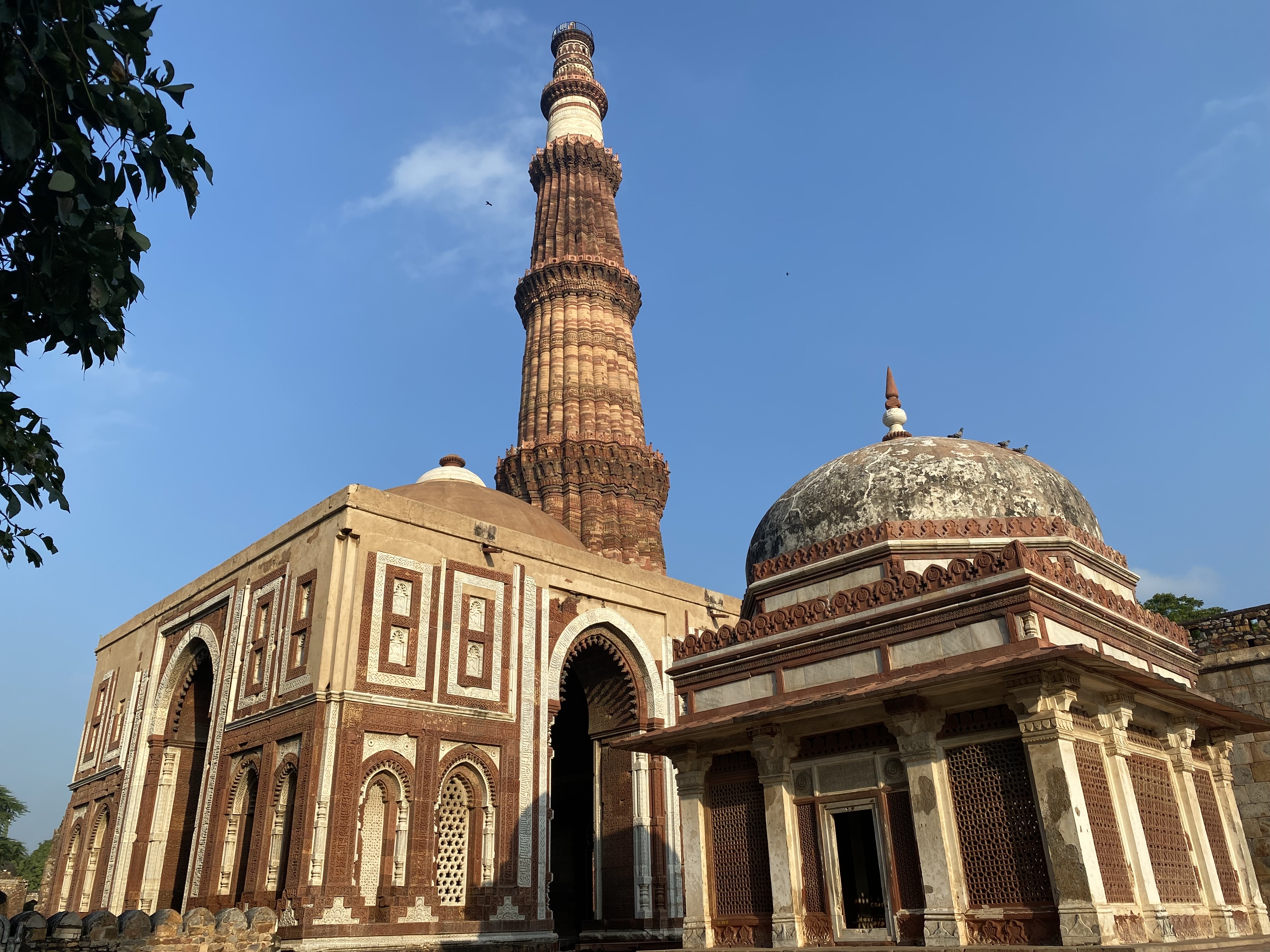
The Qutb Minar and Quwwat al-Islam Mosque complex in Delhi, begun in the 1190s and expanded in the 13th to 14th centuries

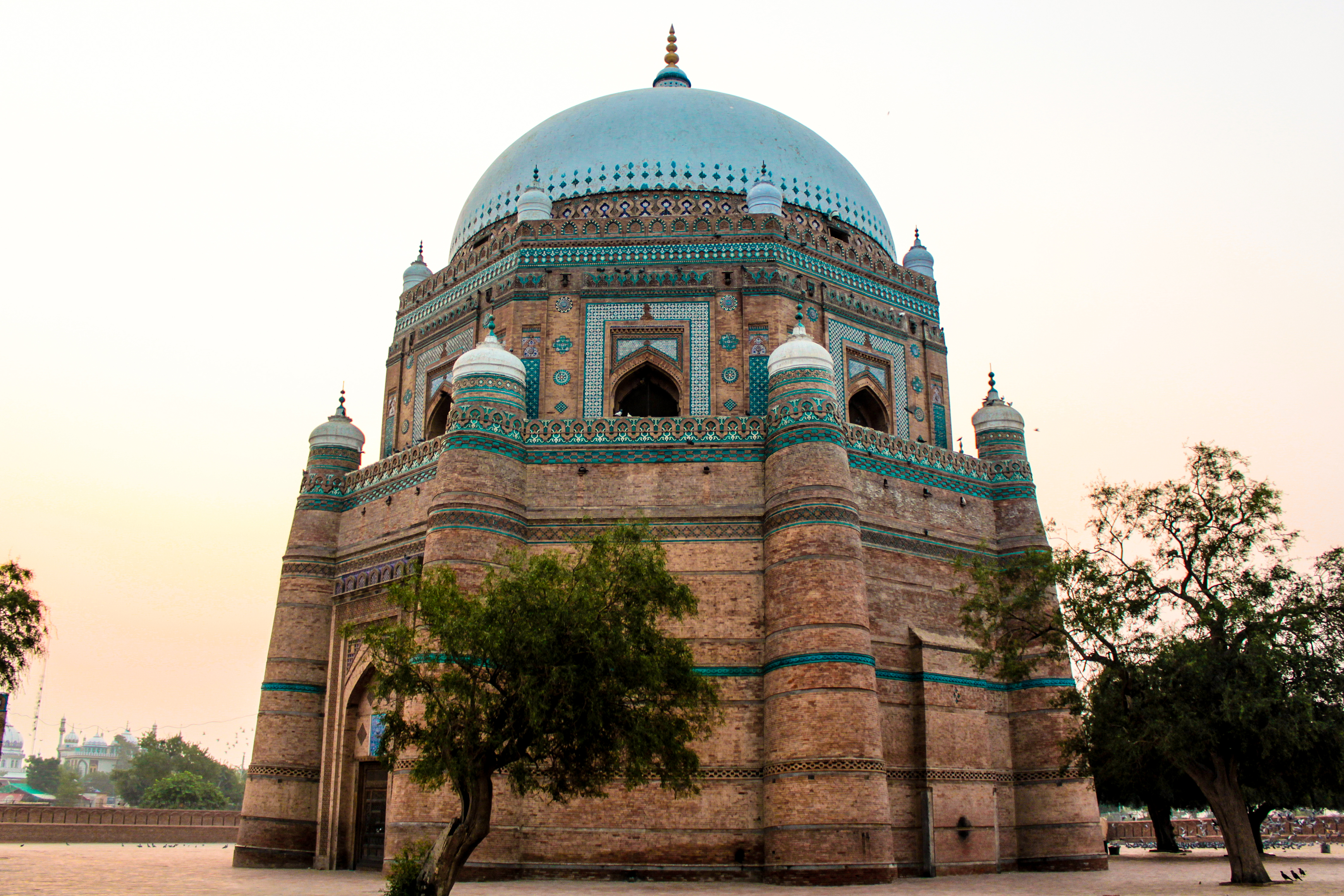
Tomb of Shah Rukn-e-Alam in Multan (circa 1335–1340), built under the Tughluq dynasty

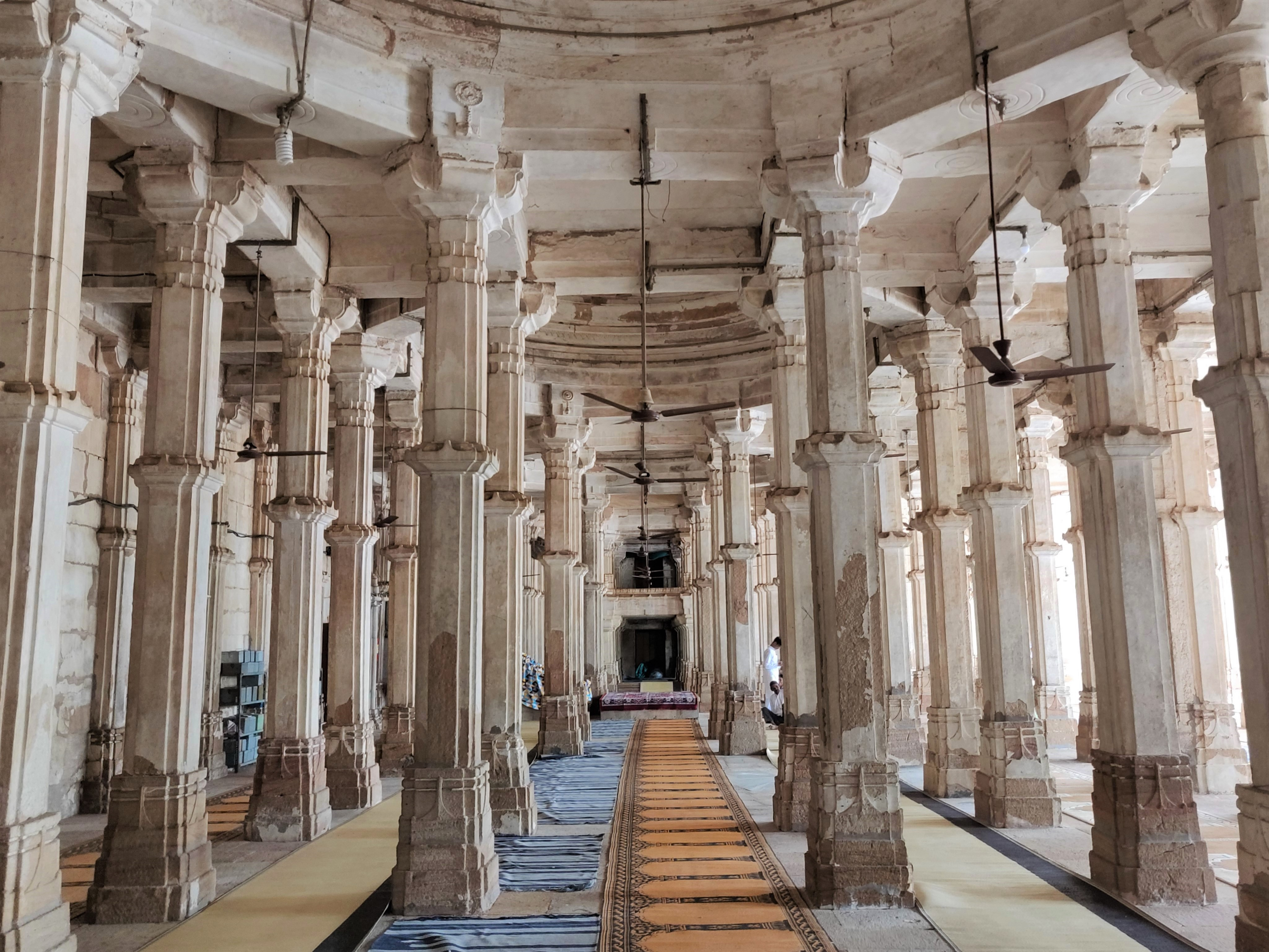
The Friday Mosque of Ahmedabad (1423), which prominently combines Islamic and indigenous Indian architectural forms

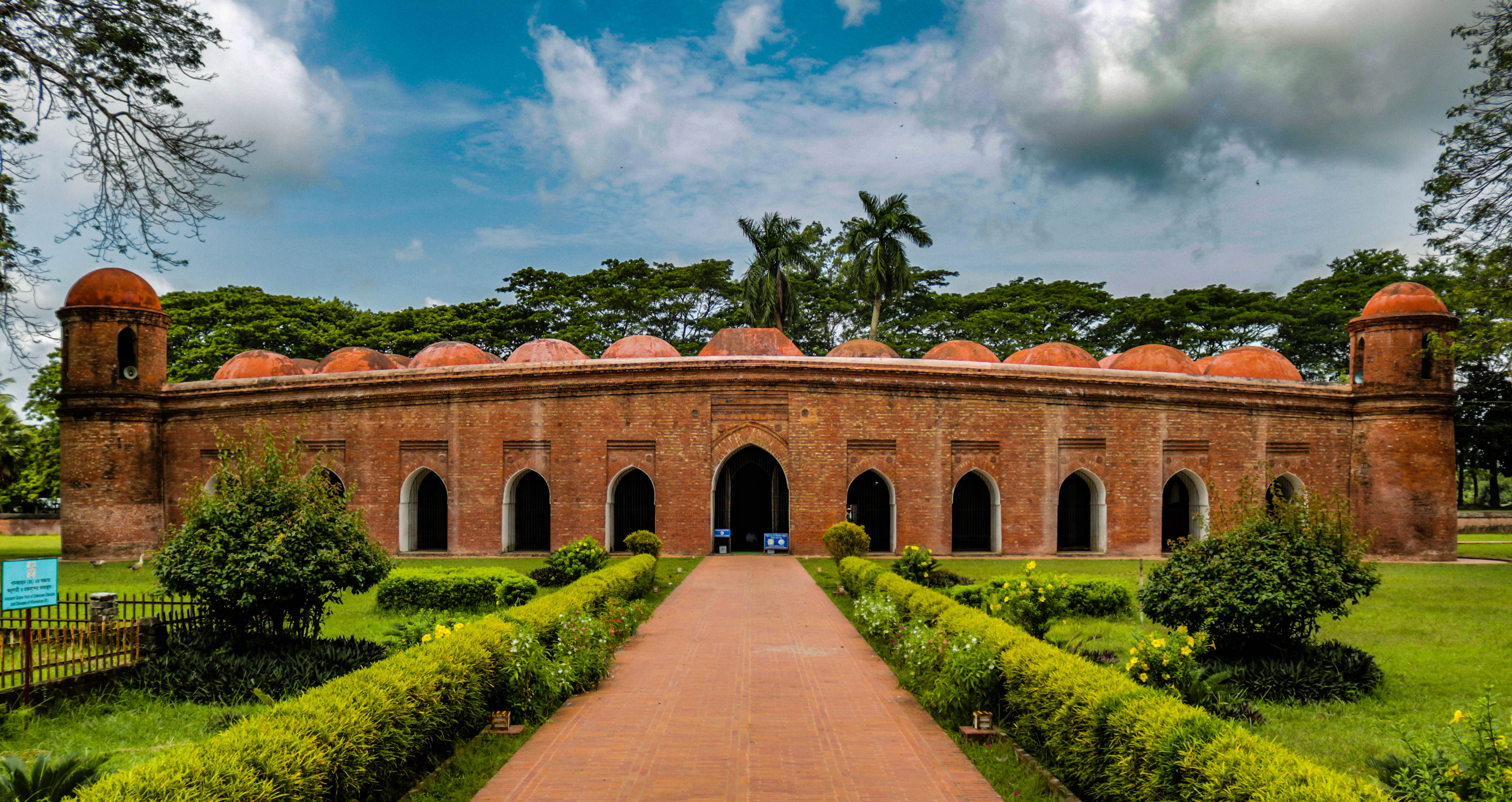
Sixty Dome Mosque in Bagerhat (circa 1450)

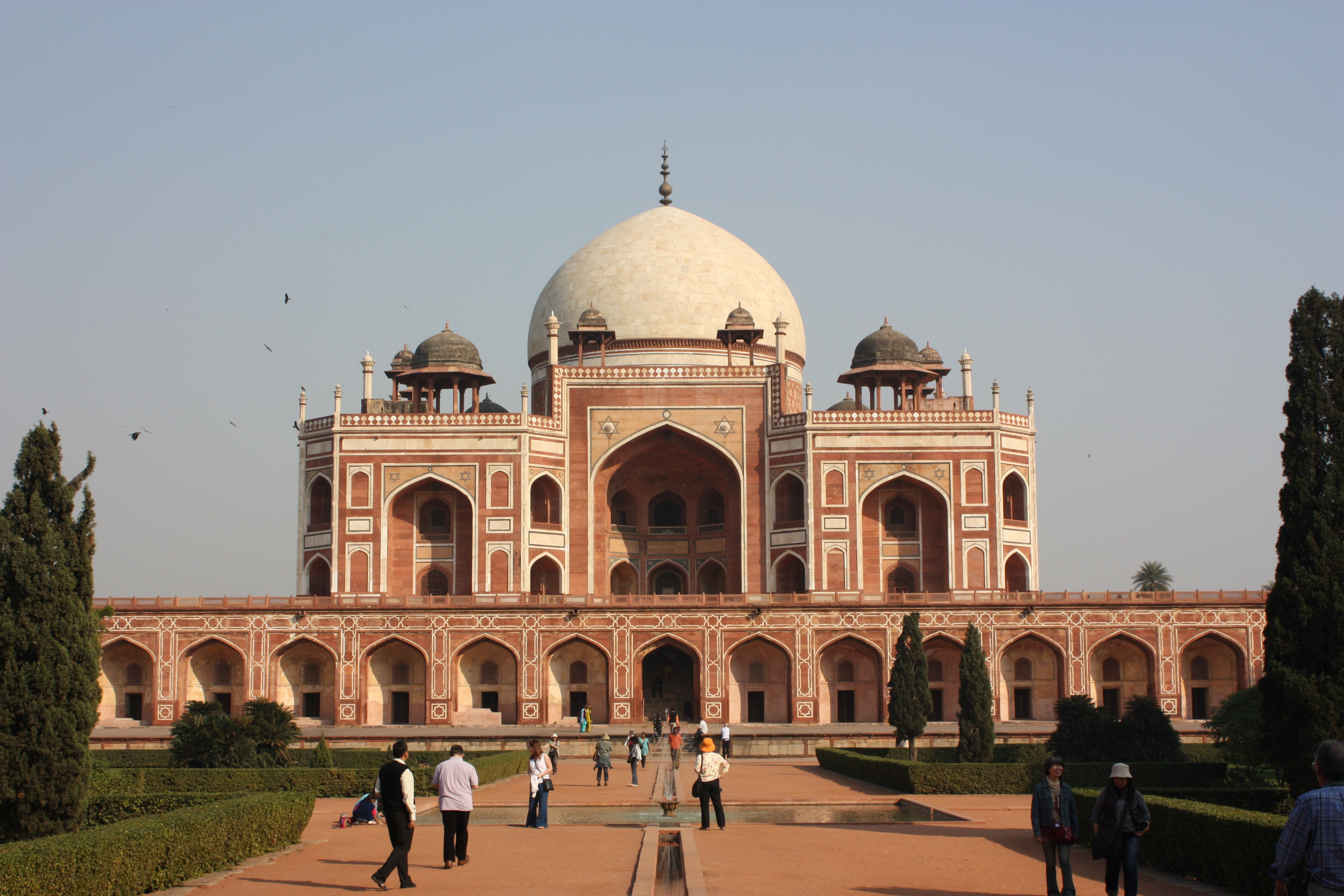
Humayun's Tomb in Delhi, the first fully developed Mughal imperial tomb (1560–1570)

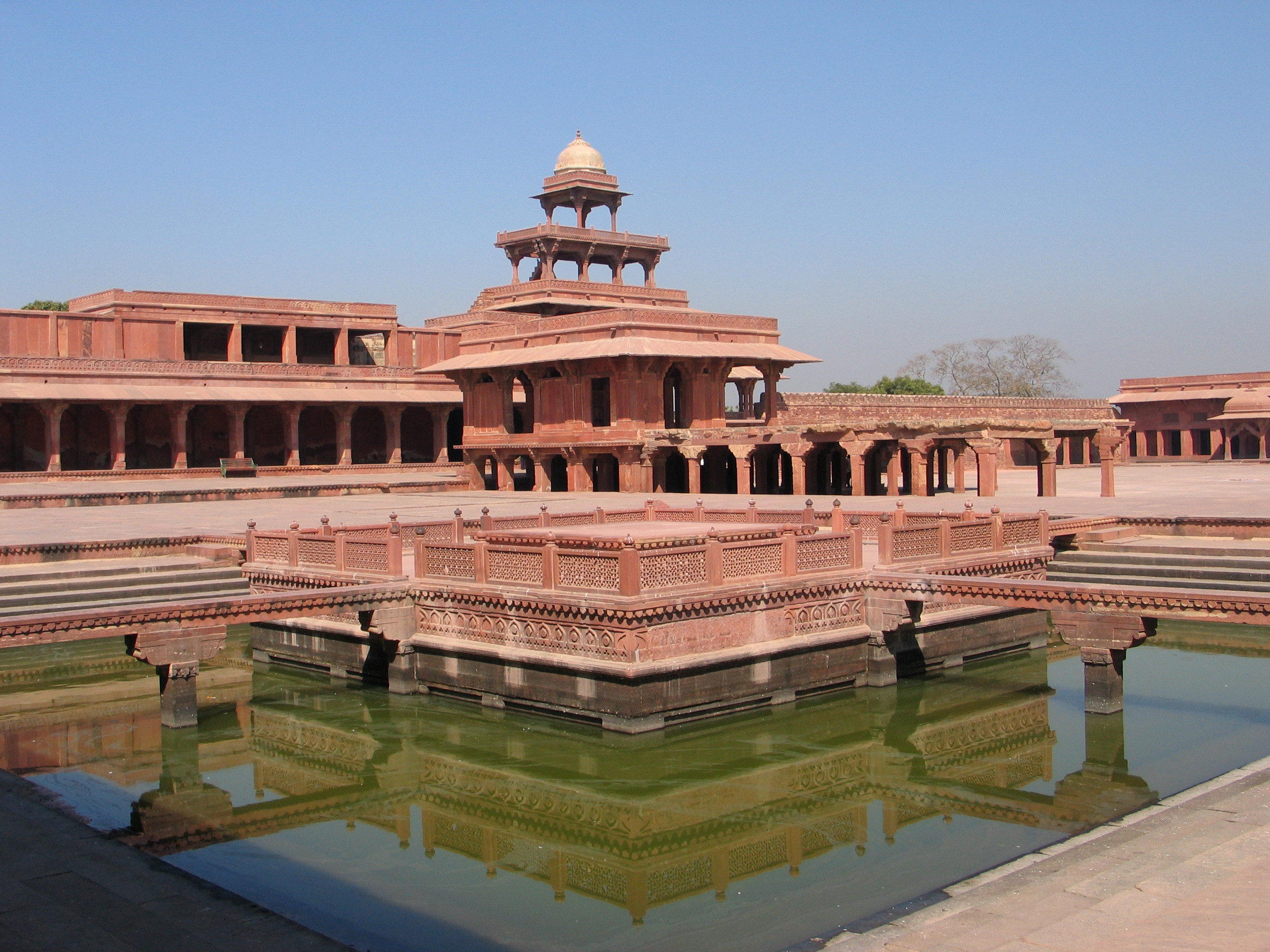
Fatehpur Sikri, a palatial complex begun in the 1560s by Akbar

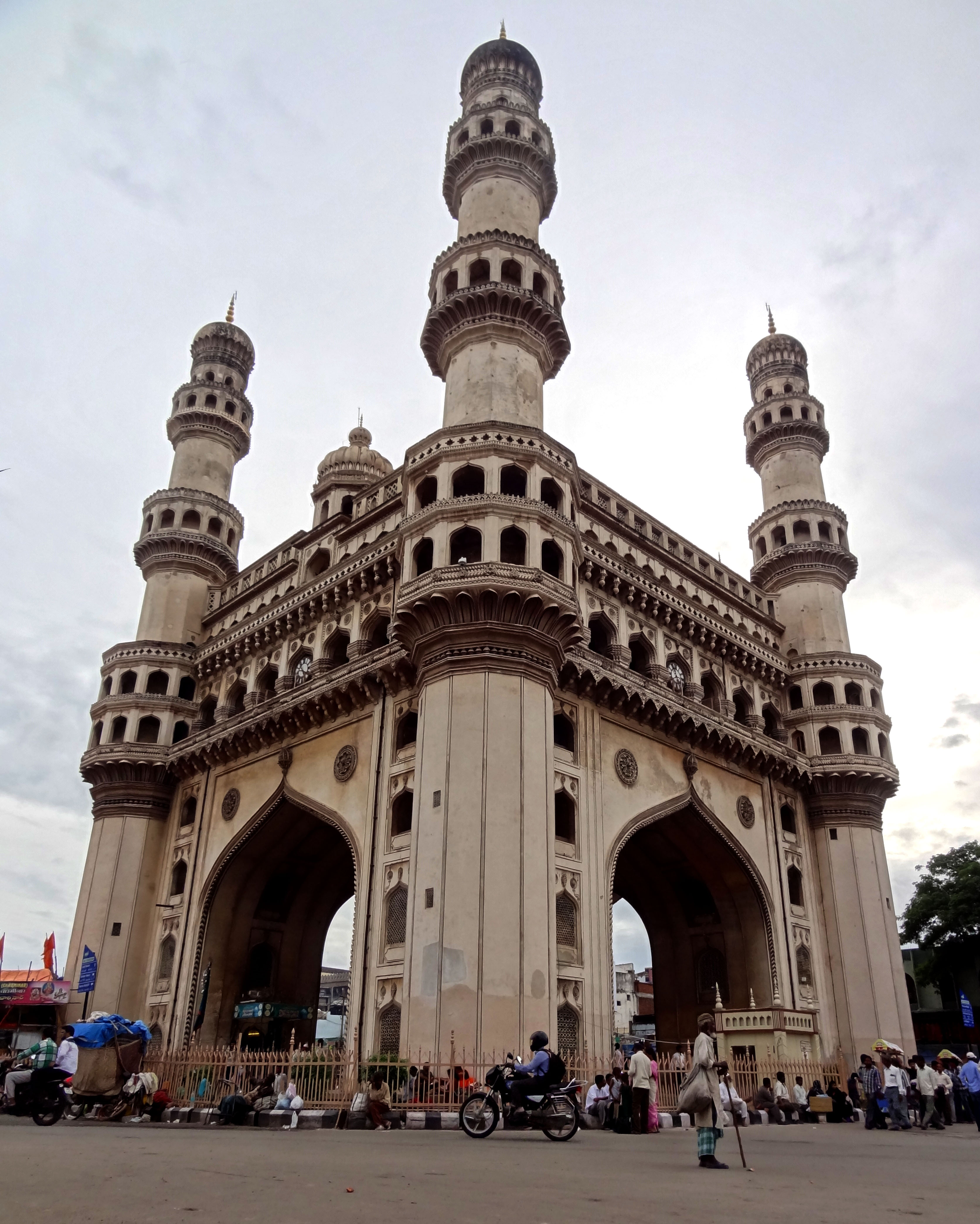
Charminar in Hyderabad (1591), an example of architecture in the Deccan Sultanates

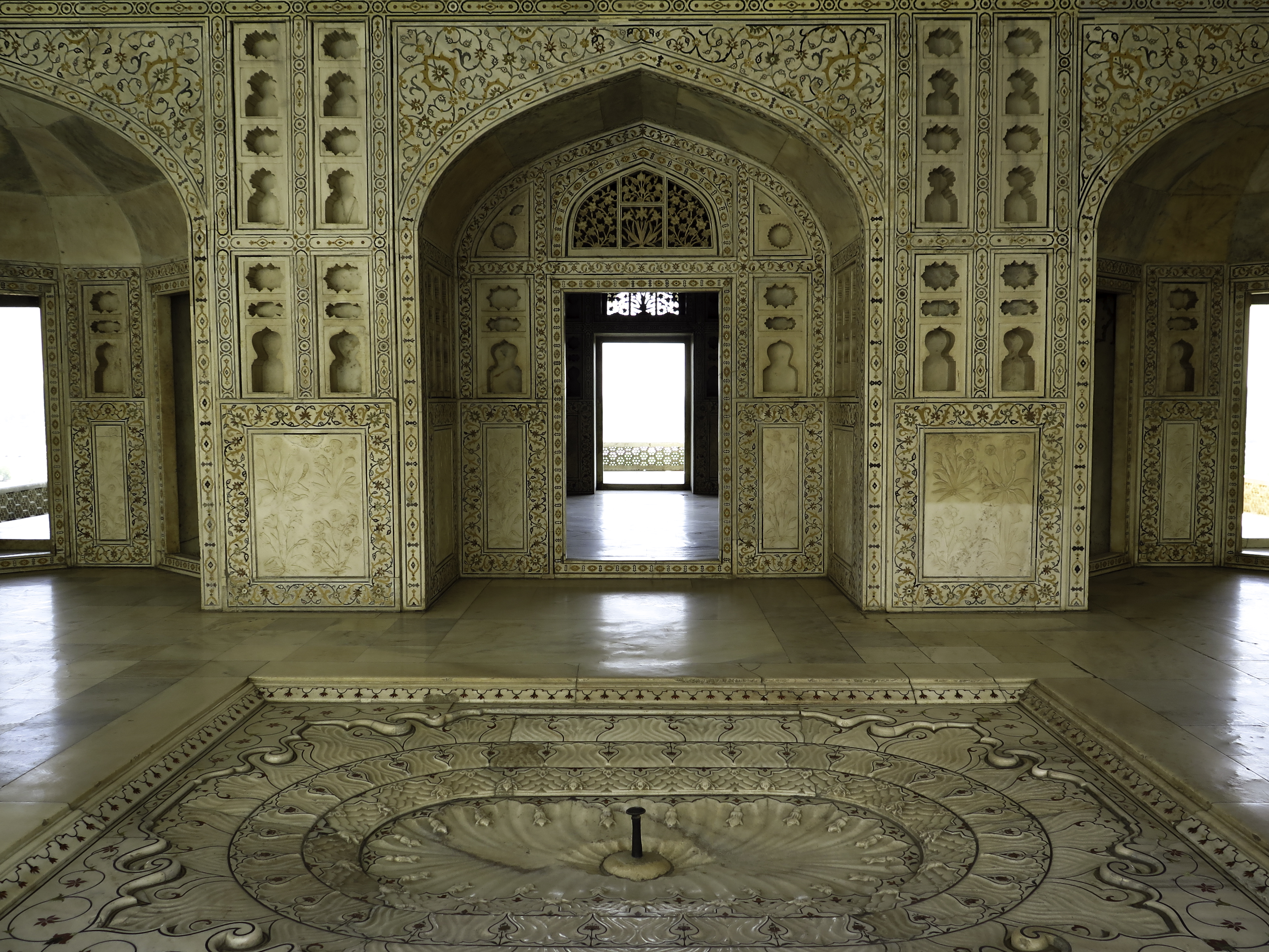
Room with fountain in the Muthamman Burj (1628–30), added by Shah Jahan inside the Agra Fort built by Akbar

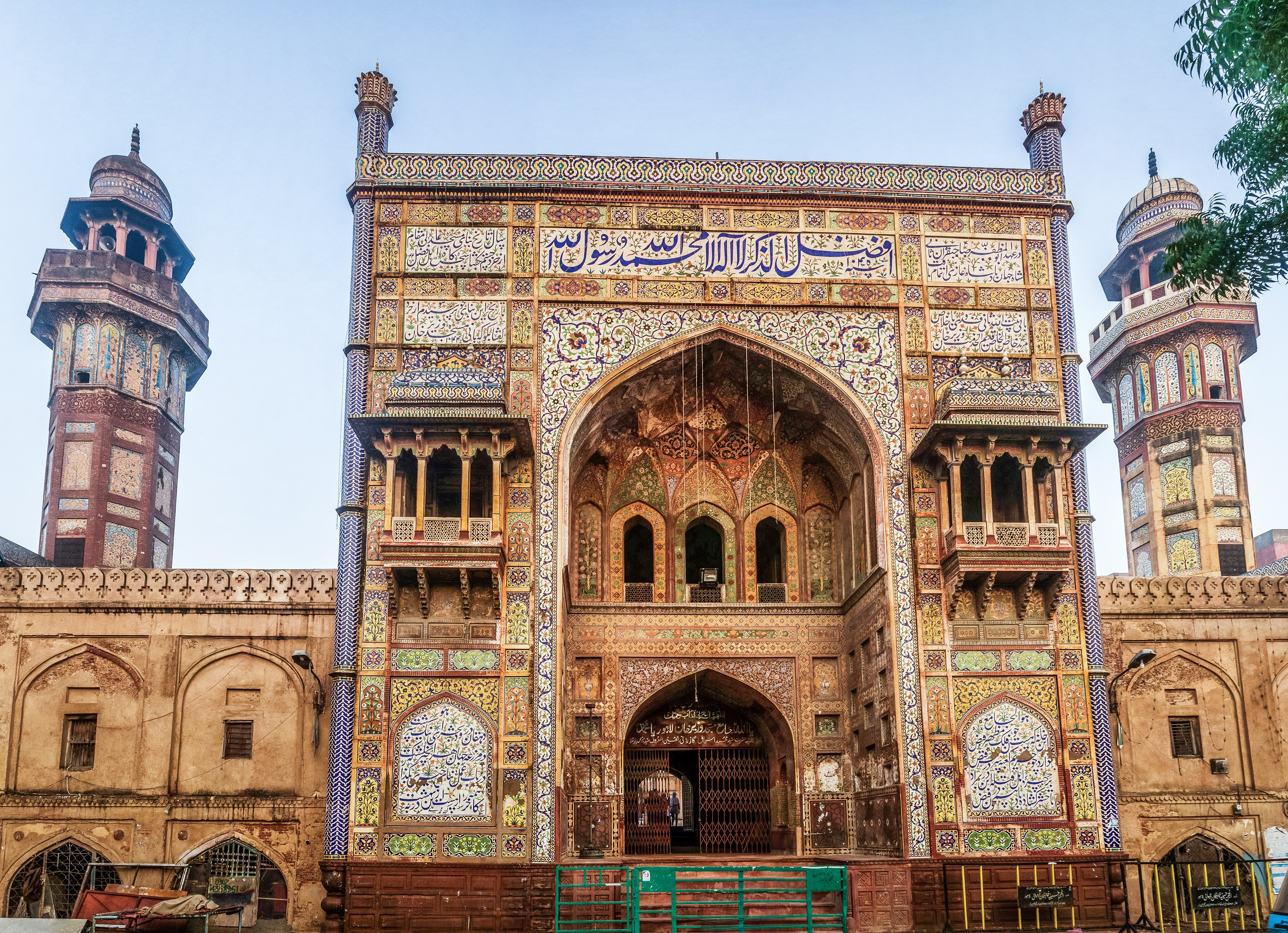
Wazir Khan Mosque in Lahore (1635), notable for its tile-decorated surfaces

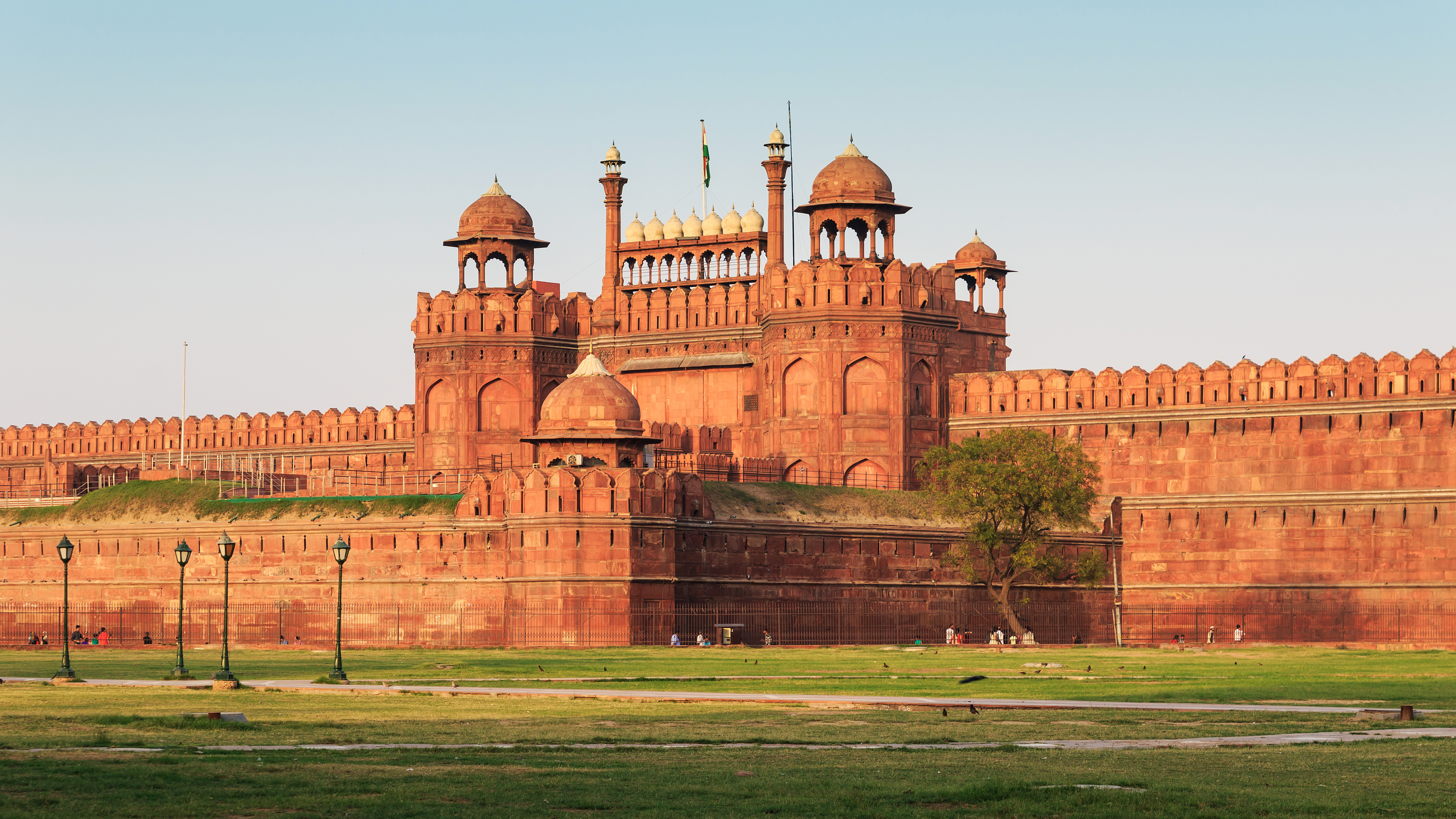
The Red Fort in Delhi, built between 1639 and 1648 as the citadel of Shah Jahan's new capital

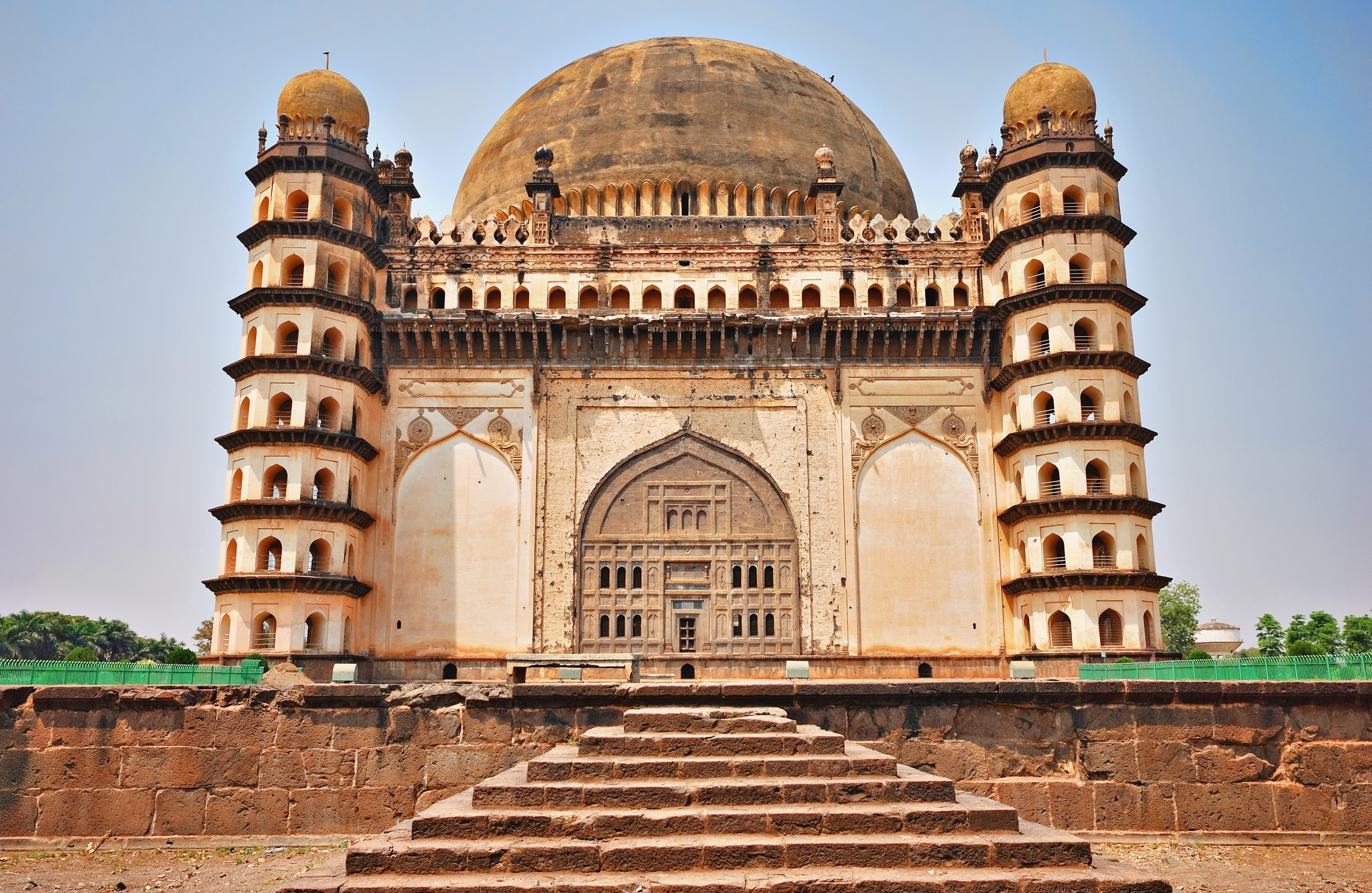
Gol Gumbaz in Bijapur (1656), another example built by a Deccan sultanate

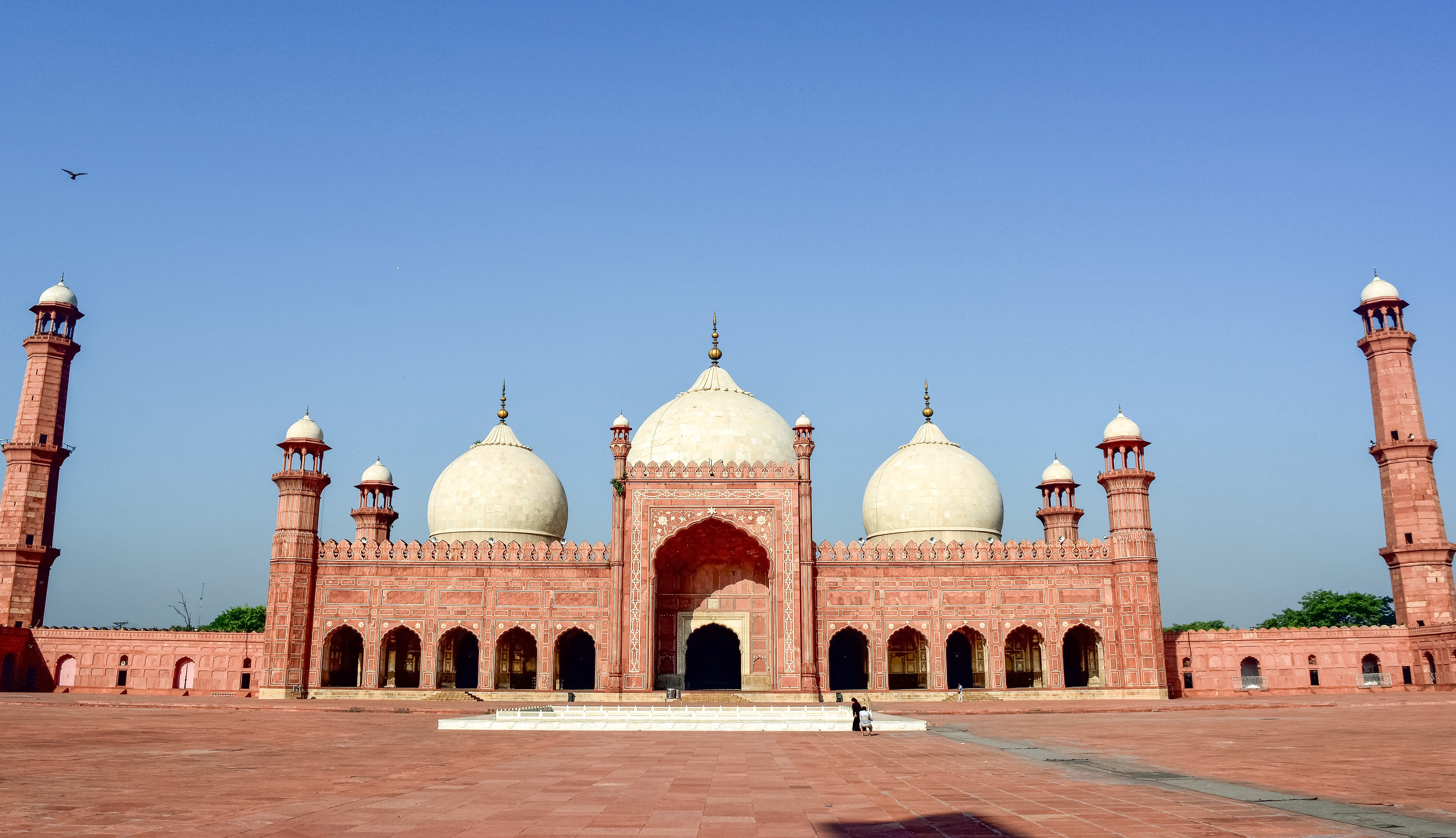
Badshahi Mosque in Lahore (c. 1673–1674)

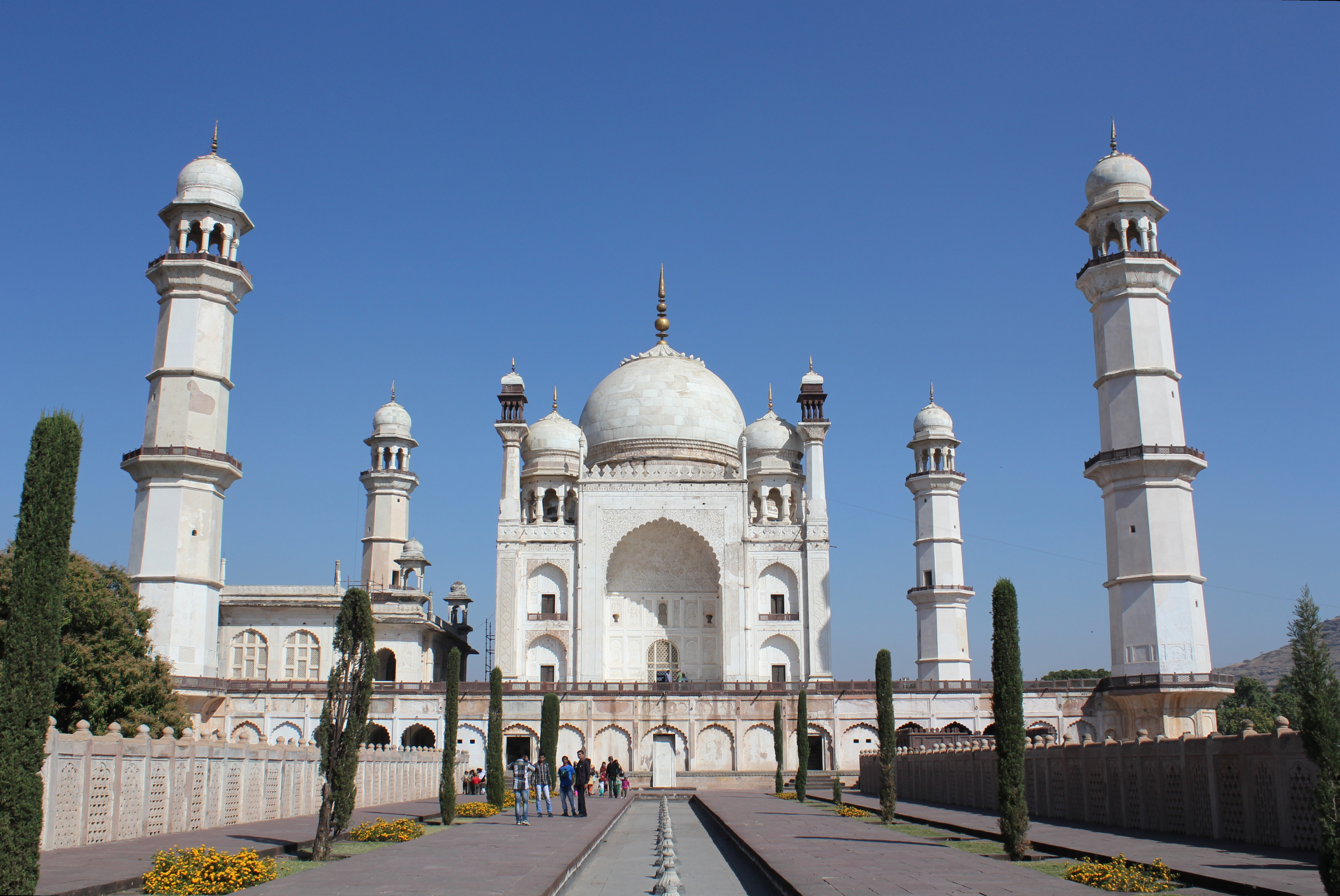
Bibi Ka Maqbara at Aurangabad (1678)

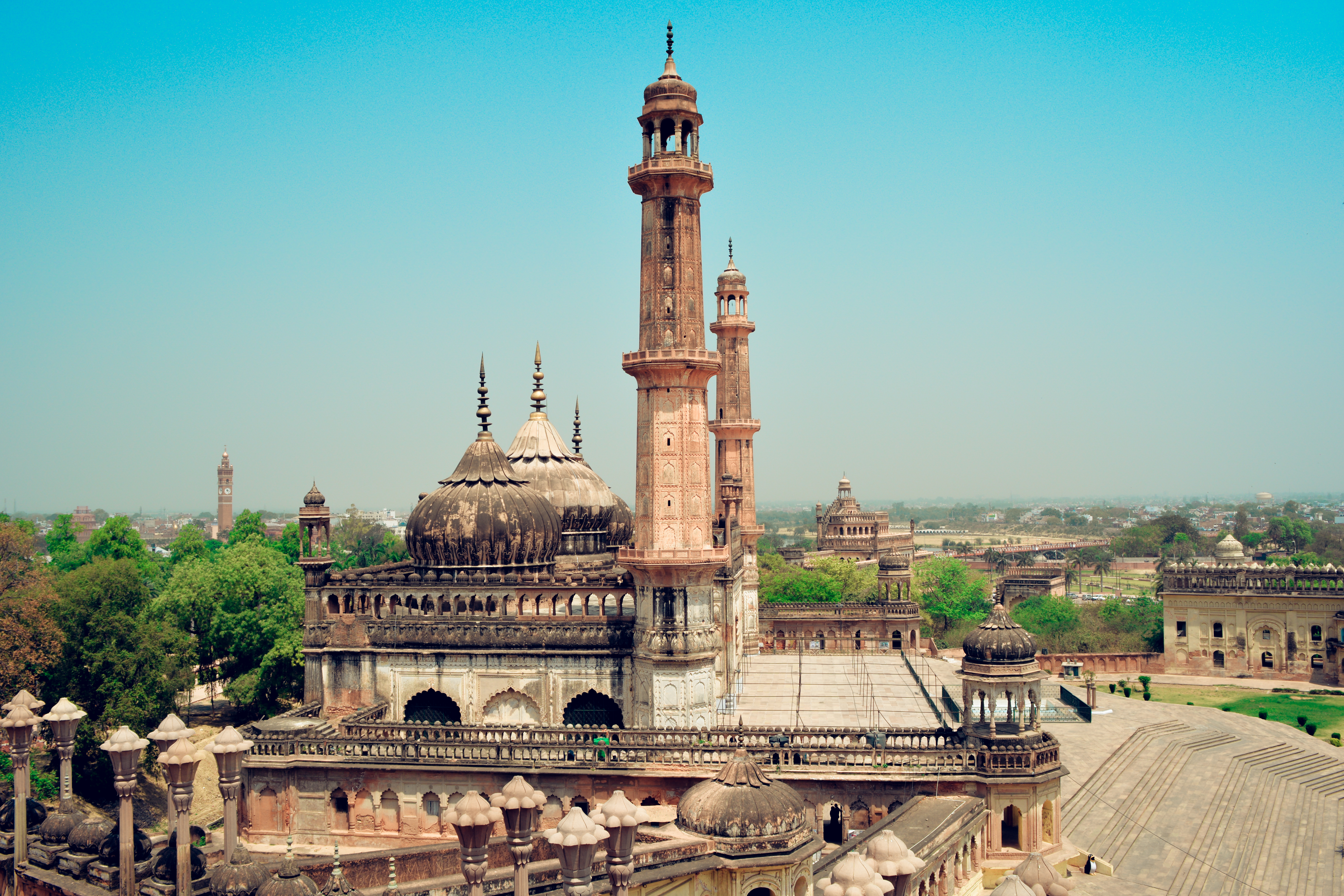
The Asfi Mosque of the Bara Imambara complex in Lucknow (c. 1780)

=== Malay-Indonesian ===
Islam spread gradually in the Malay Peninsula and the surrounding Indonesian archipelago from the 12th century onwards, and especially during the 15th century as the Sultanate of Malacca and its surrounding cultural sphere politically dominated the region. The introduction of Islam was slow and gradual. The advent of Islam did not lead to the introduction of a new building tradition but saw the appropriation of existing architectural forms, which were reinterpreted to suit Muslim requirements. Existing architectural features in Malay-Indonesia such as the candi bentar gate, paduraksa (normally marks the entrance to the most sacred precincts), balai nobat (a tower supposedly used to store royal musical instruments) and the sacred pyramidal roof was used for Islamic architecture. Prayer times are often signalled in advance by striking a large drum known as beduk, thus minarets weren't of need to these mosques let alone domes which multi-layered pyramidal roofs. One rare example of an old mosque with a minaret is that of the Menara Kudus Mosque.

Malay-Indonesian mosque architecture also features strong influence from the Middle Eastern architecture styles. This style of architecture can be found on the design of mosques in Brunei, Indonesia, Malaysia, Singapore, the Philippines and Thailand. Today, with increasing Muslim pilgrimage to Mecca, Malay-Indonesian mosques are developing a more standard, international style, with a dome and minaret.

==== Indonesia ====
The oldest surviving mosque in Indonesia is the Great Mosque of Demak which is the royal mosque of the Sultanate of Demak, although this is not the oldest Islamic structure. The oldest Islamic structure in Indonesia are parts of the royal palace in Sultanate of Cirebon, Cirebon. The palace complex contains a chronogram which can be read as the Saka equivalent of 1454 CE. Early Islamic palaces retain many features of pre-Islamic architecture which is apparent in the gates or drum towers. The Kasepuhan Palace was probably begun in the late pre-Islamic period and continued to grow during the Hinduism-to-Islam transitional period. The complex contains clues to the stages of the process of the gradual changes as Islam become incorporated into Indonesian architecture. Two of the Hindu features adopted into Islam in the palace is the two types of gateways – the split portal (candi bentar) which provides access to the public audience pavilion and the lintel gate (paduraksa) which leads to the frontcourt.

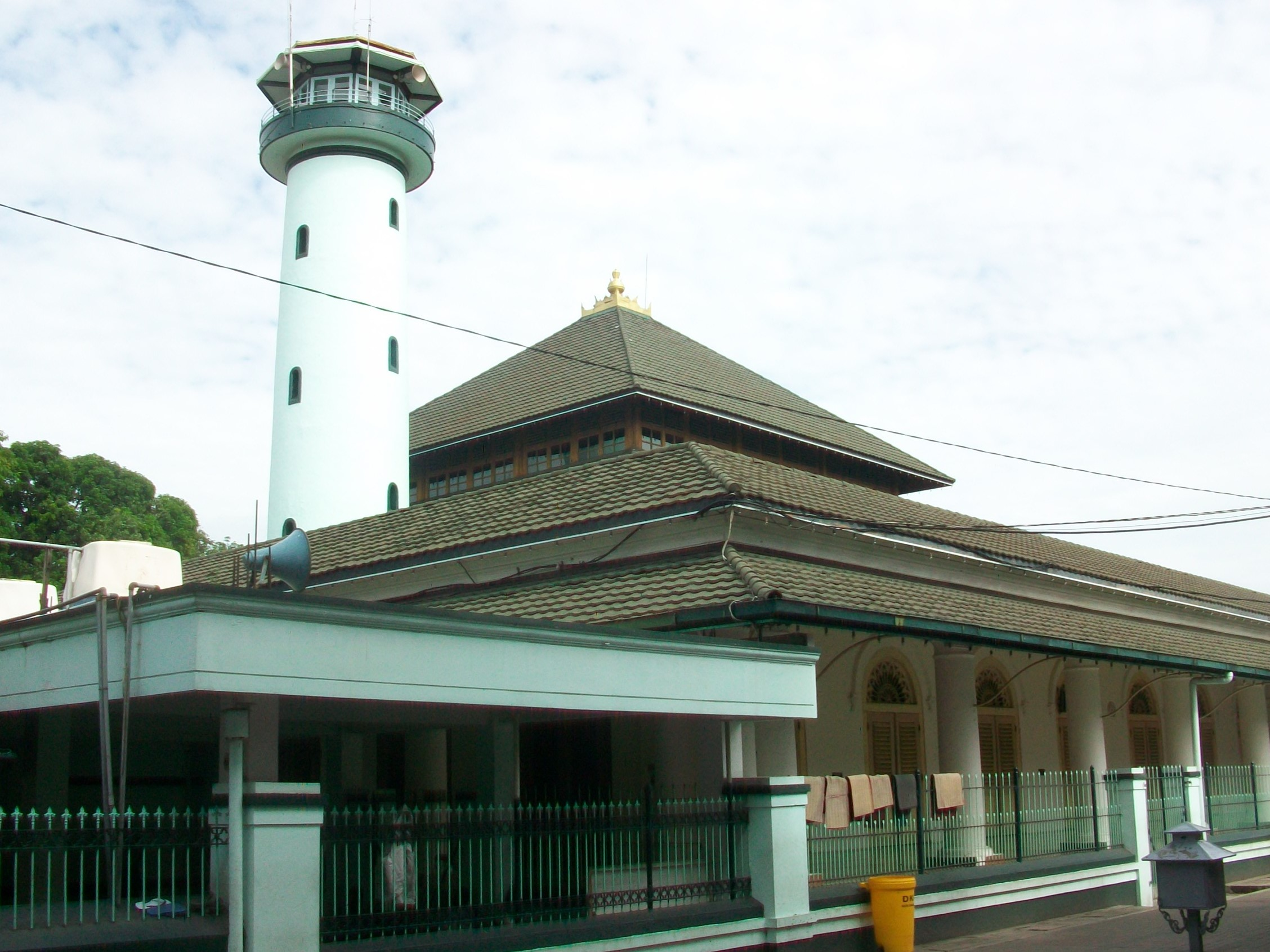
Ampel Mosque in Surabaya One of the oldest surviving mosques in Indonesia.

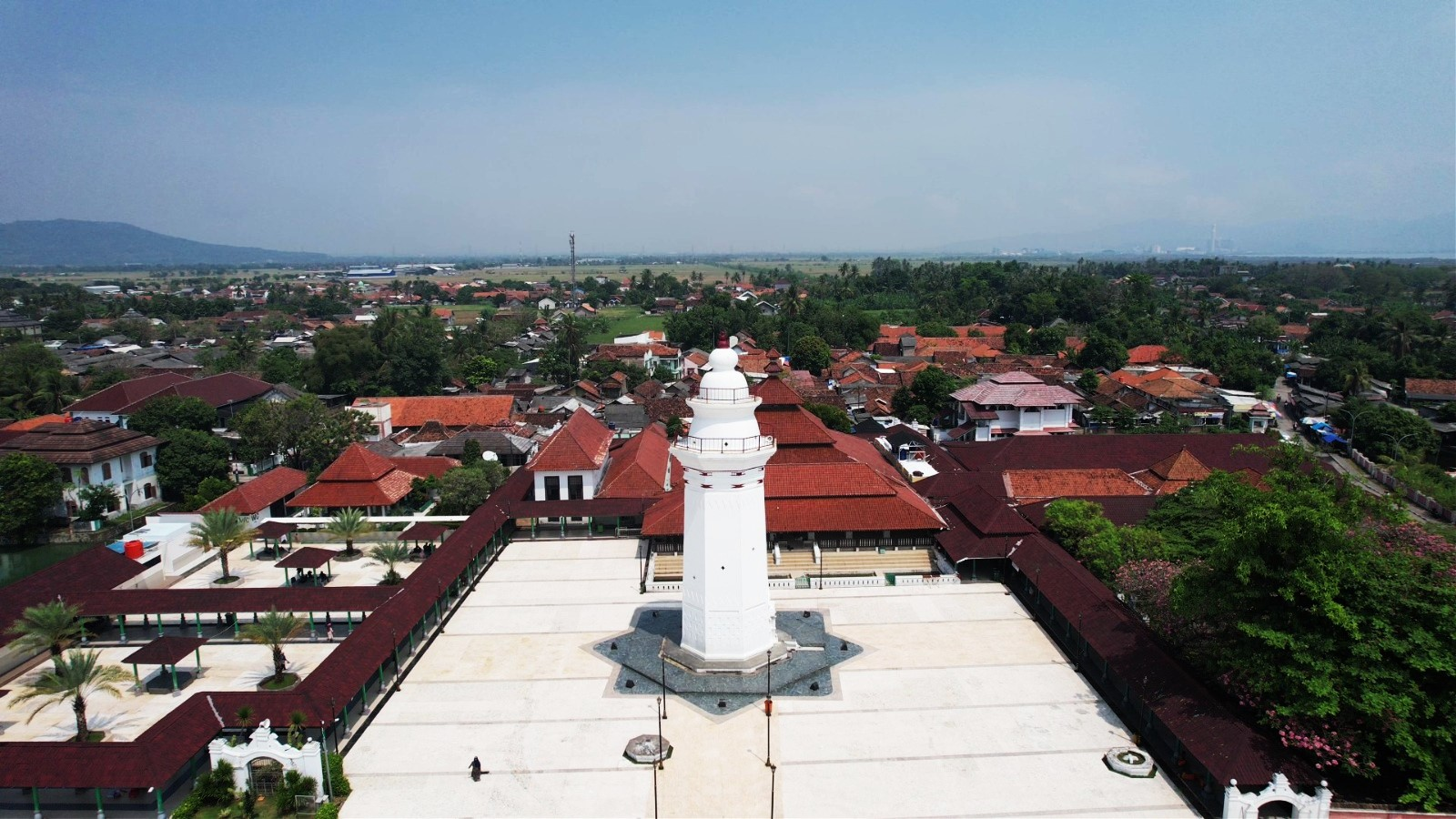
Great Mosque of Banten in Serang, the construction of the mosque was started around 1552 and was completed in 1566, its 24 meter high minaret was added in 1632, one of the few oldest mosques in Indonesia.

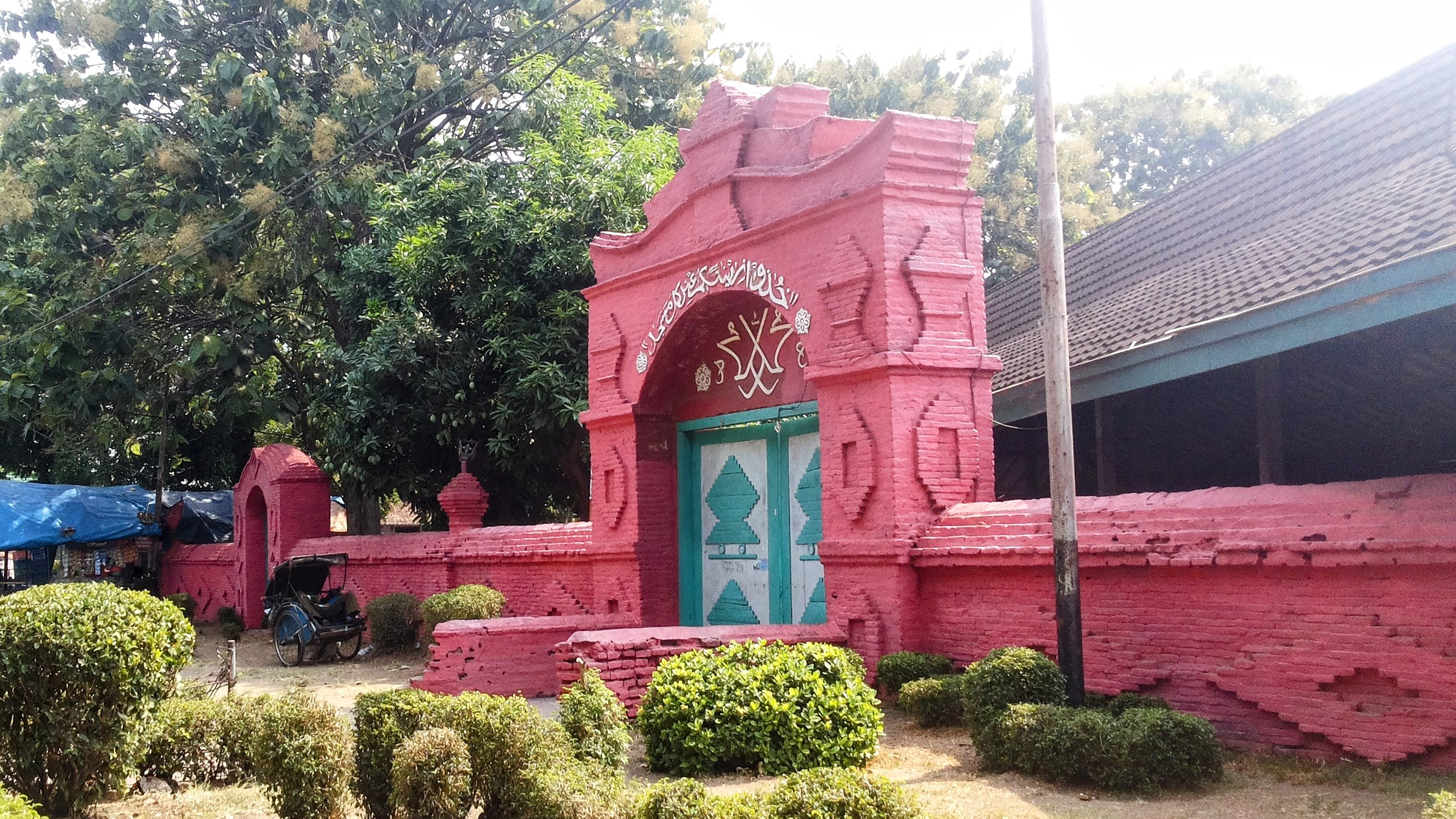
Arch gate of the Great Mosque of Cirebon, built during the 15th century.

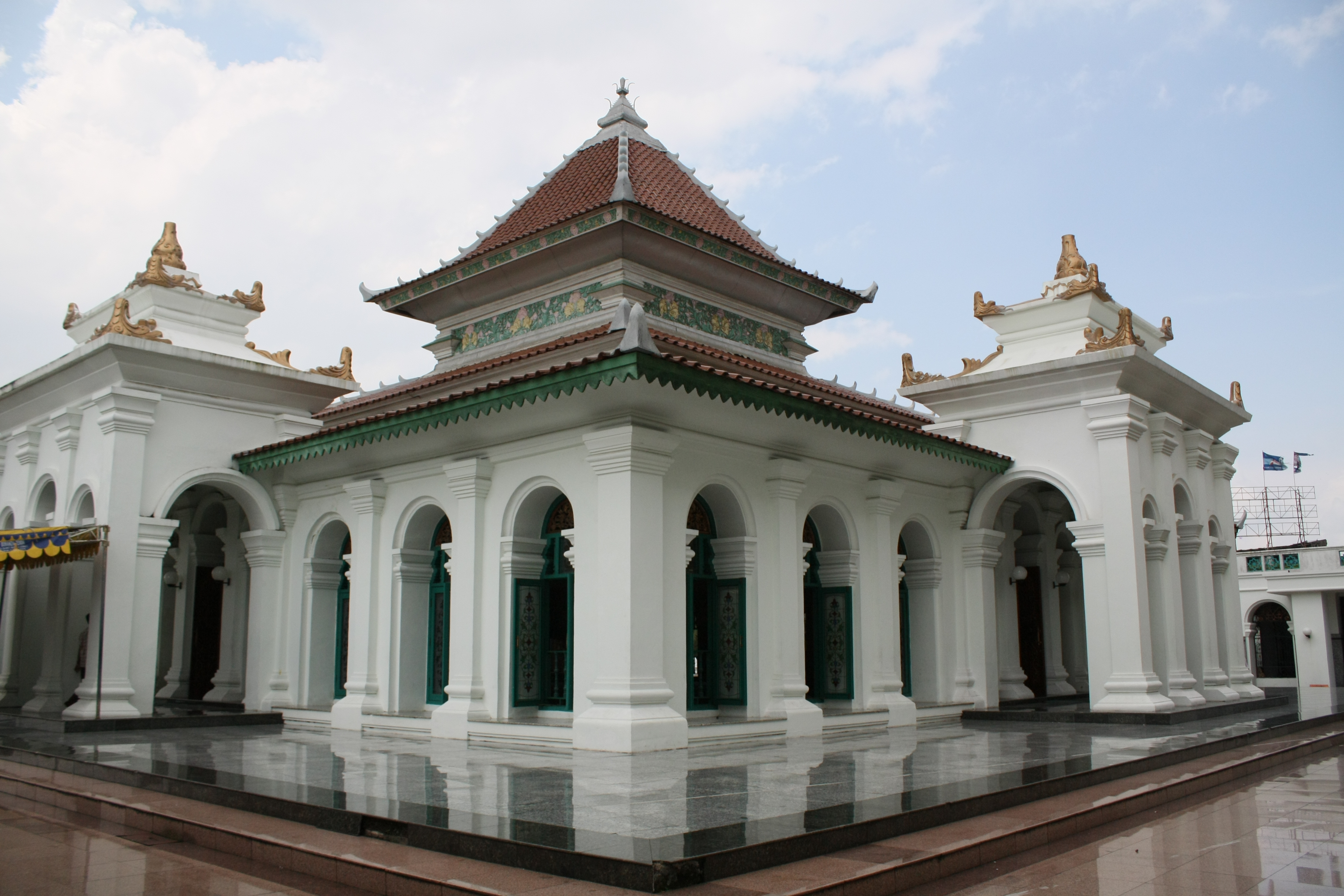
The Great Mosque of Palembang in Palembang, Sumatra built in 1738, together with other post-Demak regions, adopted a mix of Islamic Javanese and Chinese mosque architecture.

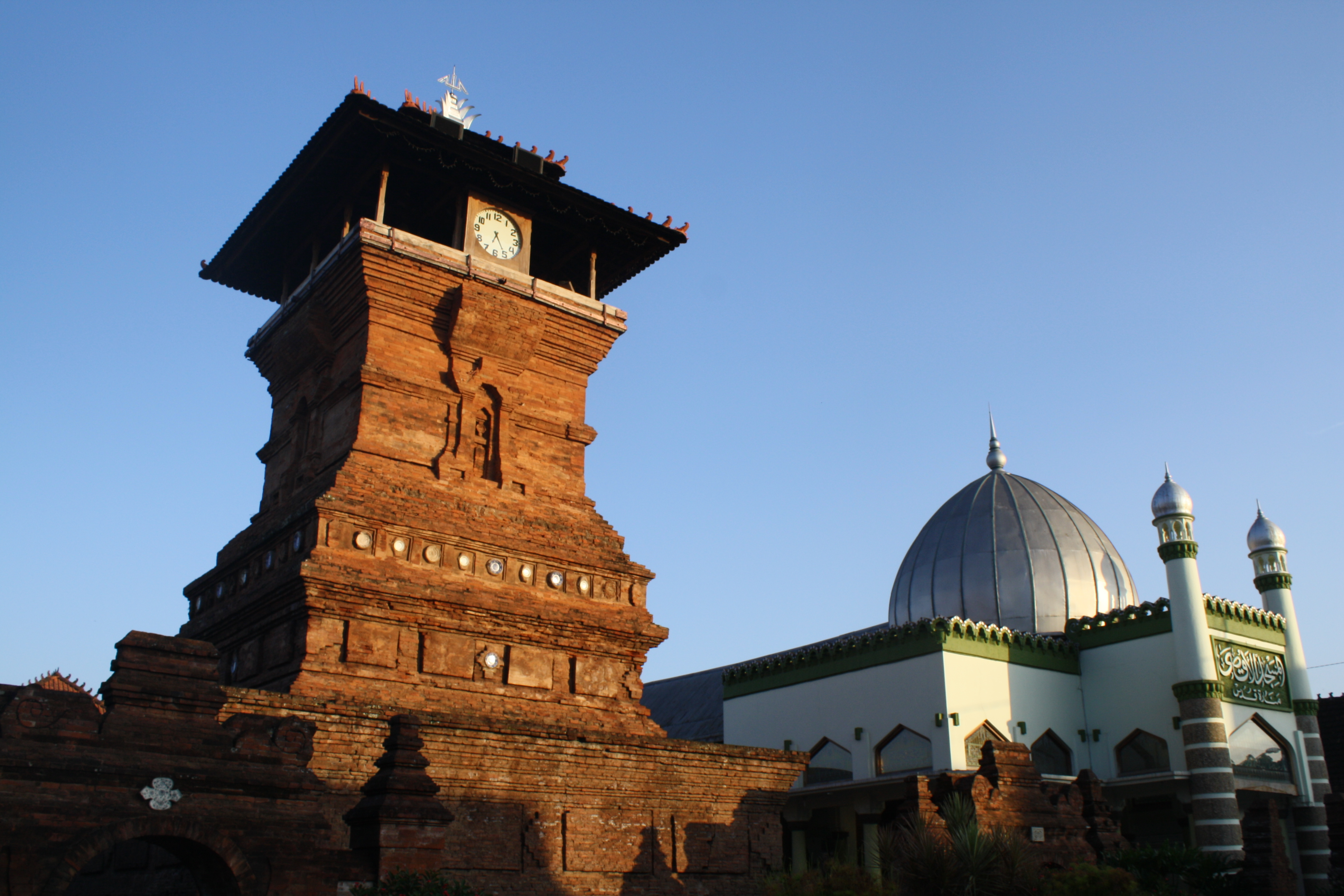
The Menara Kudus Mosque in Kudus employs a Hindu-Buddhist temple-like structure.

Al Jabbar Grand Mosque with Neo-futurism and local Sundanese concept architecture in Bandung.

==== Malaysia ====
The original mosque in Malaysia had a basic architectural style and structure: four support pillars or one large one (saka guru or tiang macu) for the main foundation, and palm fronds for the pyramidal roof. In Malacca, the architectural design is a cross between local Malay, Indian and Chinese architecture. Traditionally, the minaret resembles a pagoda with the style of a balai nobat, a special building where traditional palace music instruments are stored. An ancient cemetery also usually lies next to the mosque where notable local preachers and teachers are buried.

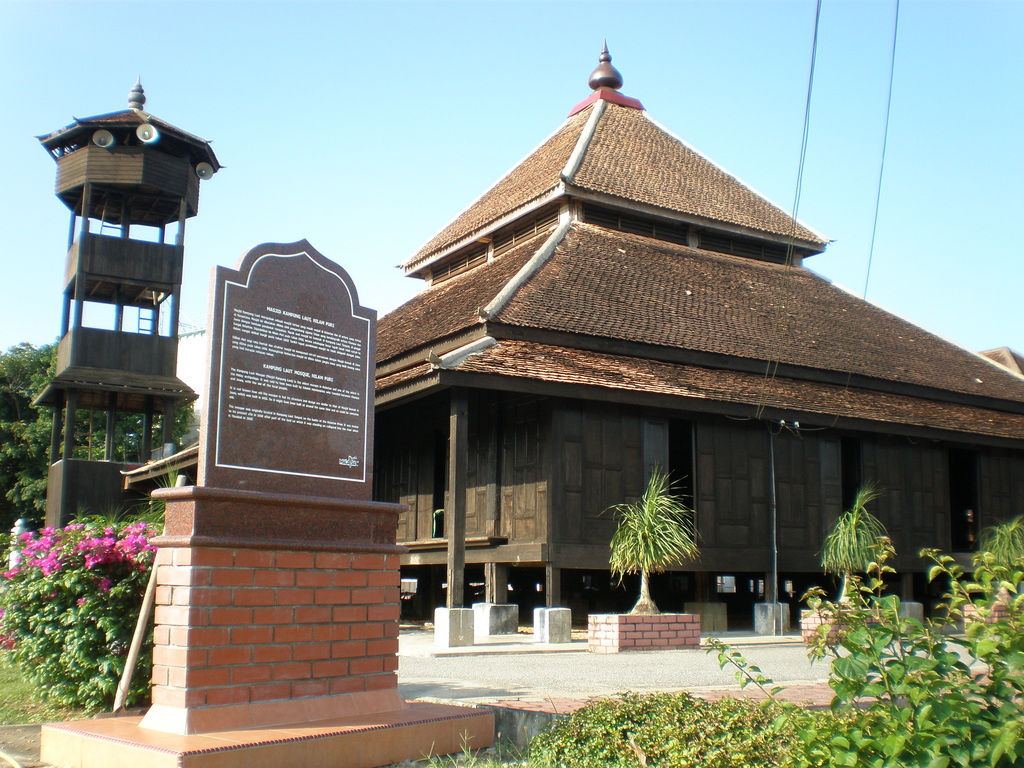
Masjid Kampung Laut

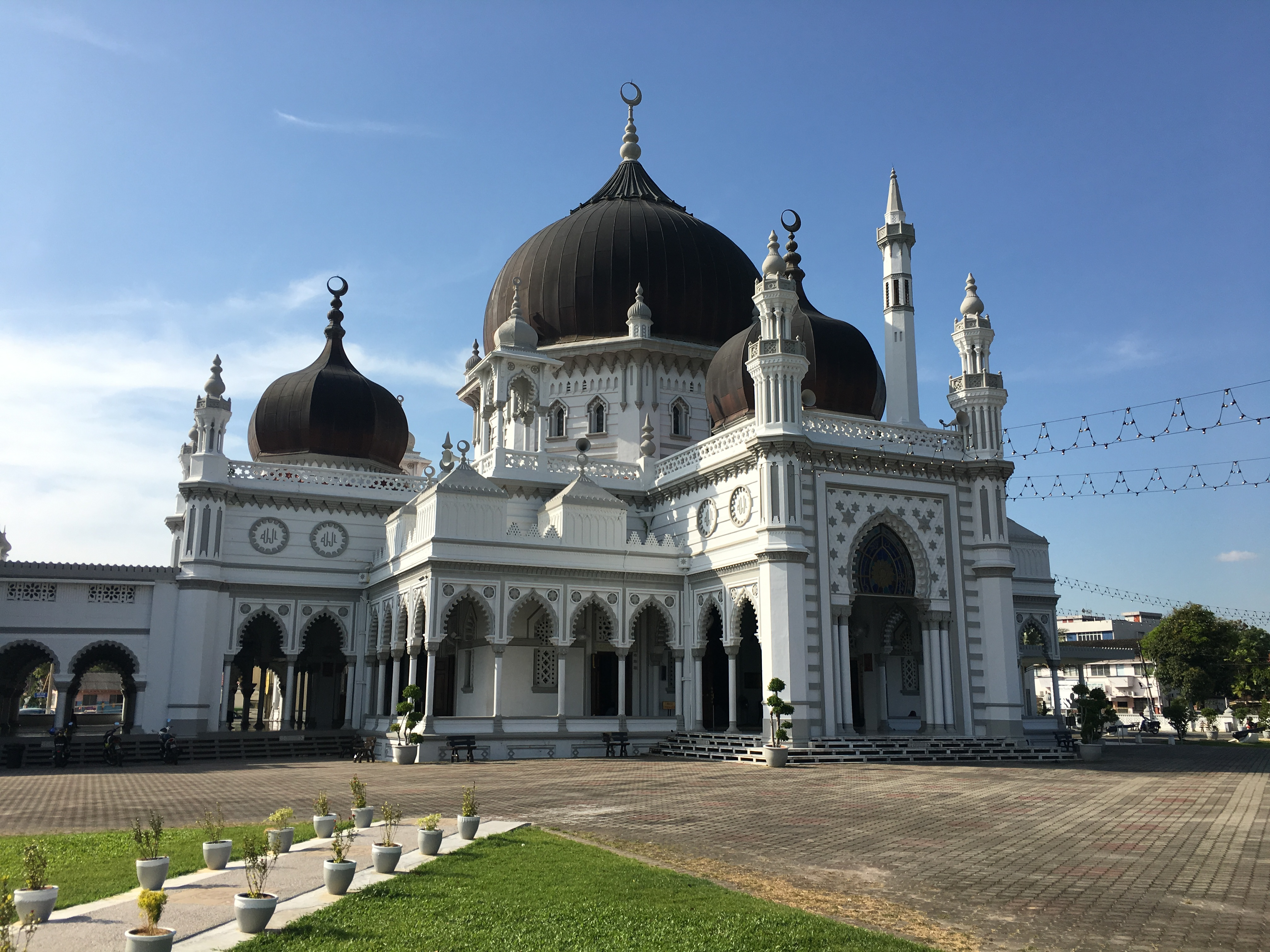
Masjid Zahir

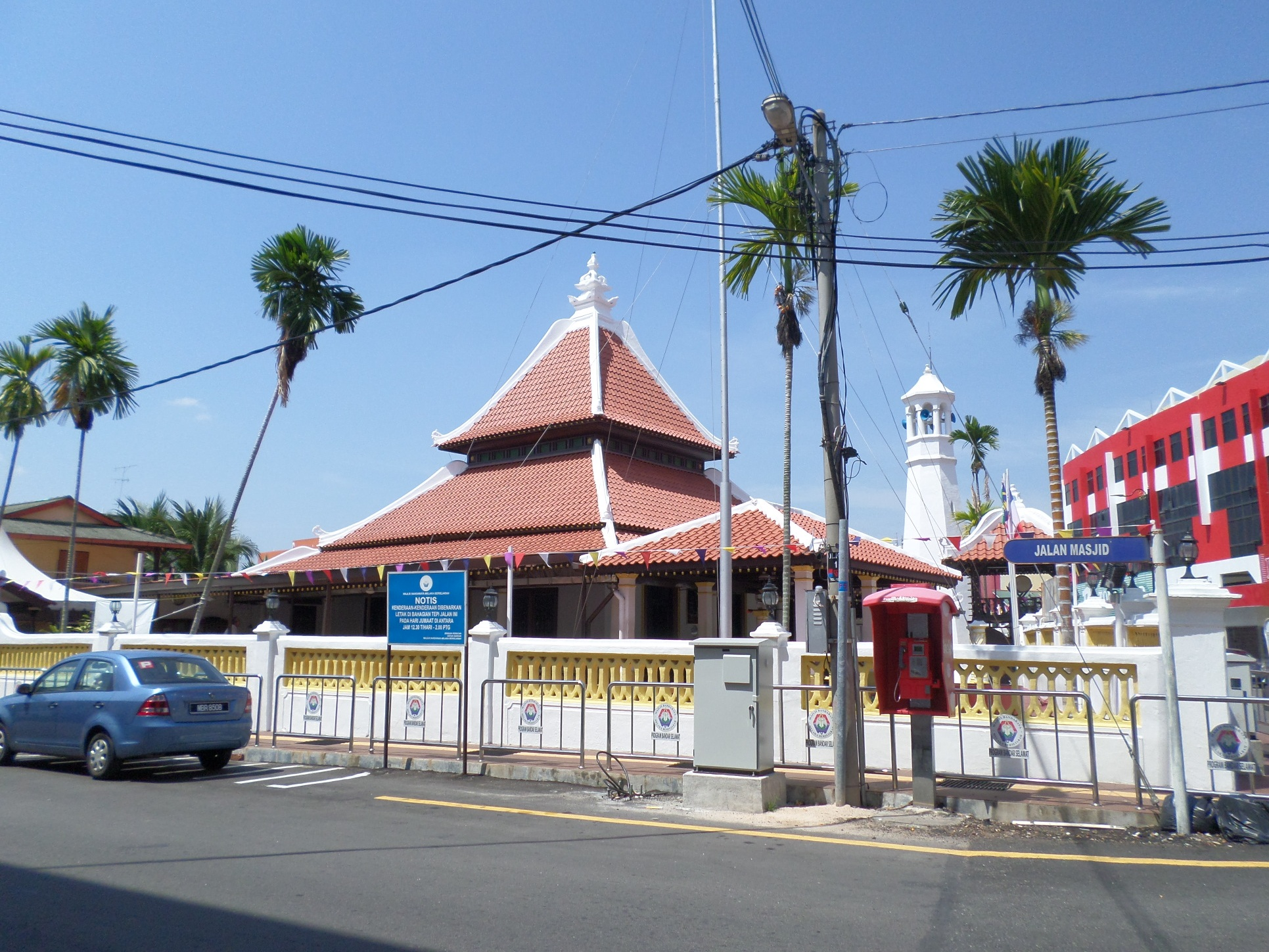
Kampung Hulu Mosque

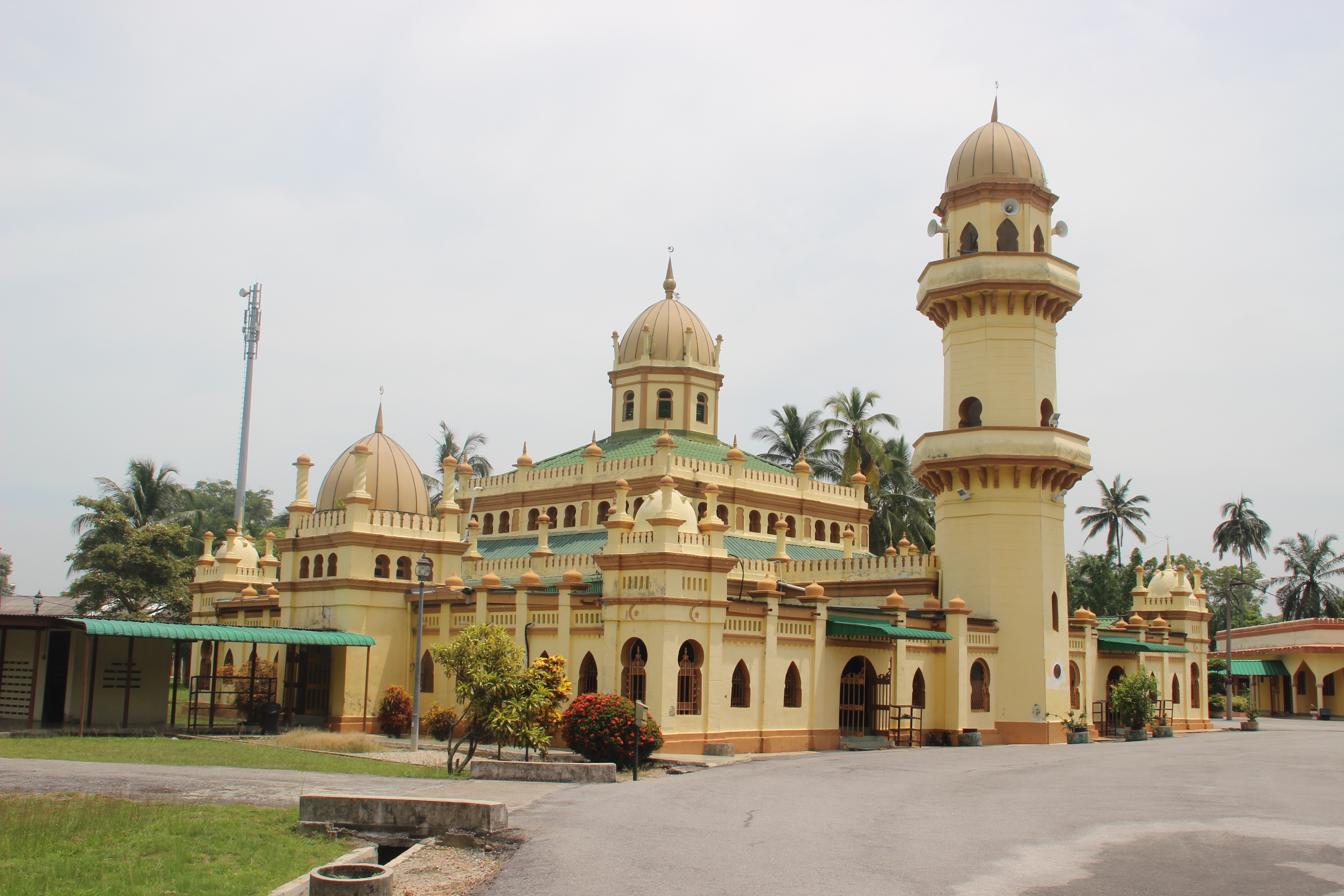
Sultan Alaeddin Royal Mosque

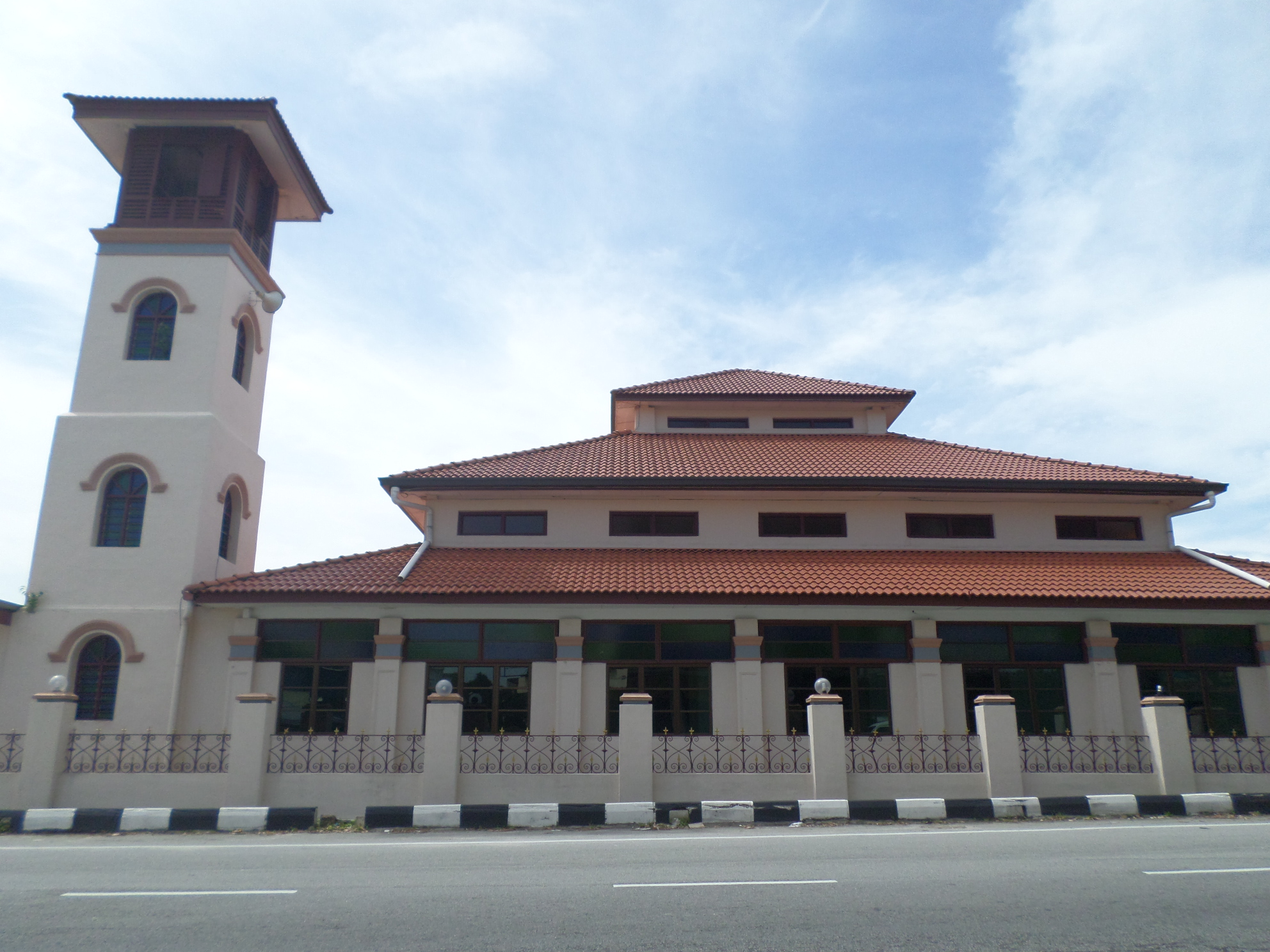
Paloh Mosque

=== Chinese ===
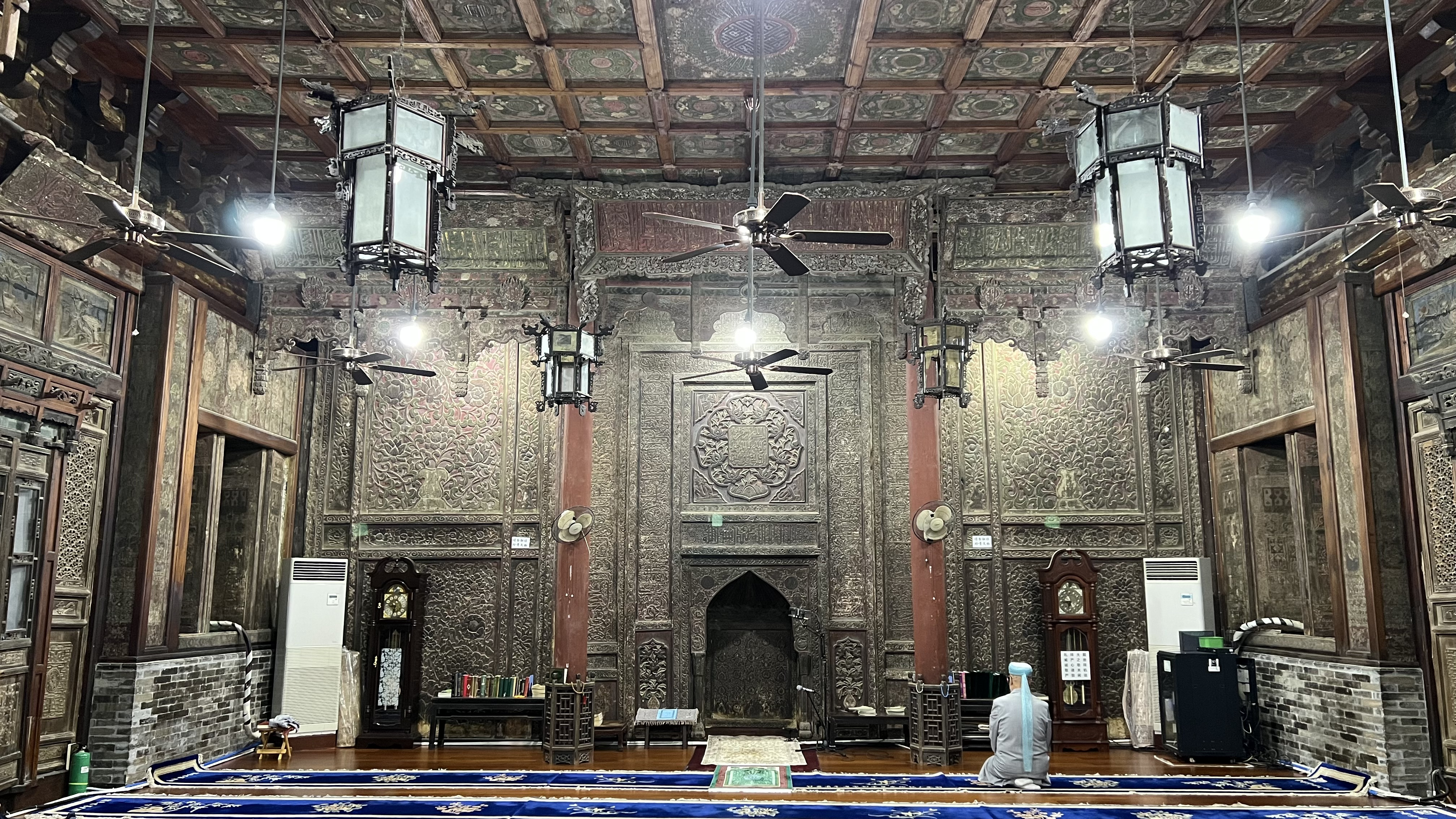
The main prayer hall and mihrab of the Great Mosque of Xi'an, China (est. 742)

As in other regions, Chinese Islamic architecture reflects local architecture in its style. Some Chinese mosques, especially in eastern China, resemble traditional Chinese temples, with flared Buddhist-style roofs and minarets resembling pagodas. In western China, mosques resemble those of the Middle East, with slender minarets, arches, and domed roofs. In northwest China, the Chinese Hui built their mosques in a combination of eastern and western styles. The mosques are set in walled courtyards entered through archways and they feature flared roofs, miniature domes, and minarets.

The first Chinese mosque was established in the seventh century during the Tang dynasty in Xi'an. The Great Mosque of Xi'an, whose current buildings date from the Ming dynasty, does not replicate many of the features often associated with traditional mosques. Instead, it follows traditional Chinese architecture.

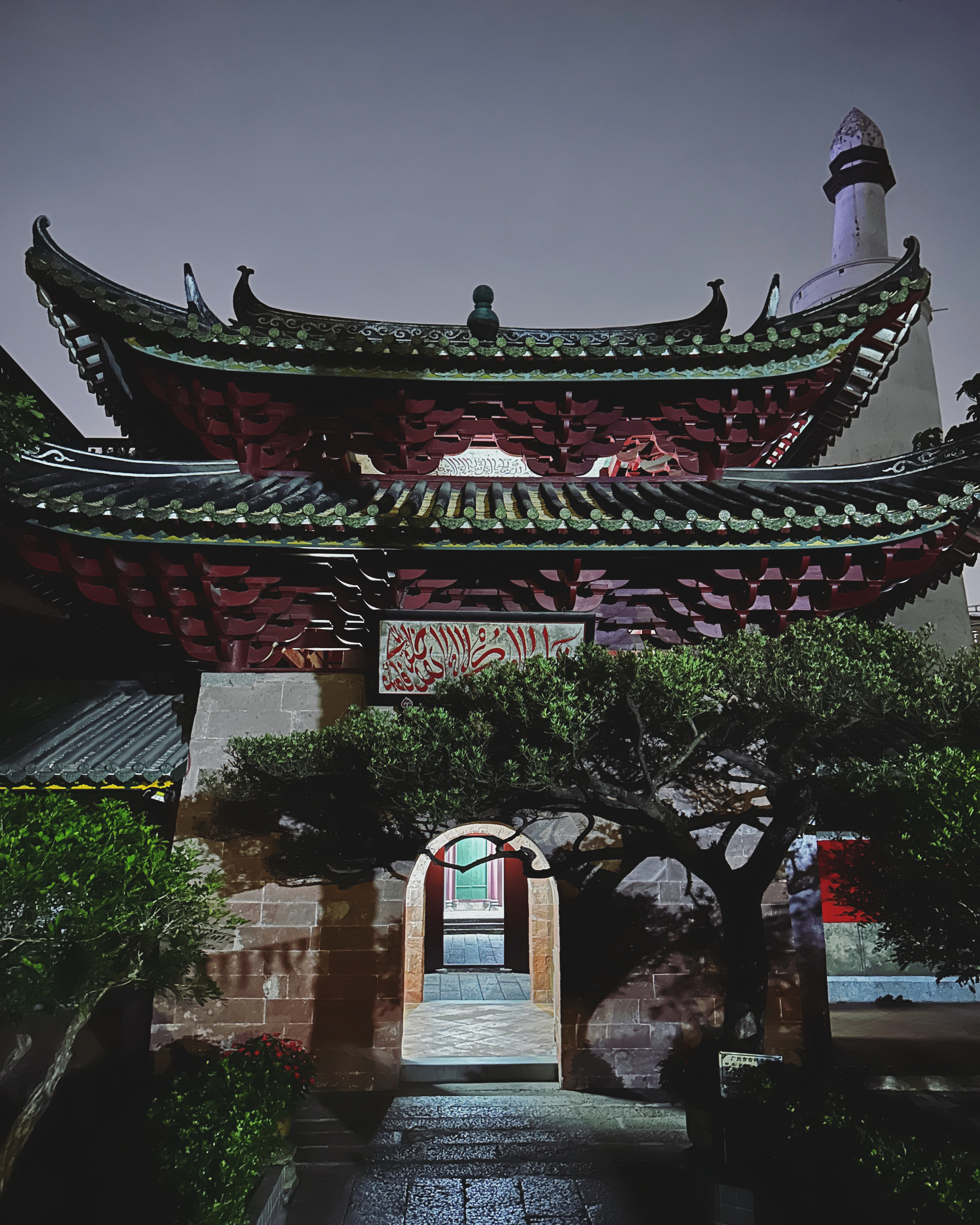
Huaisheng Mosque (est. in the 7th century)

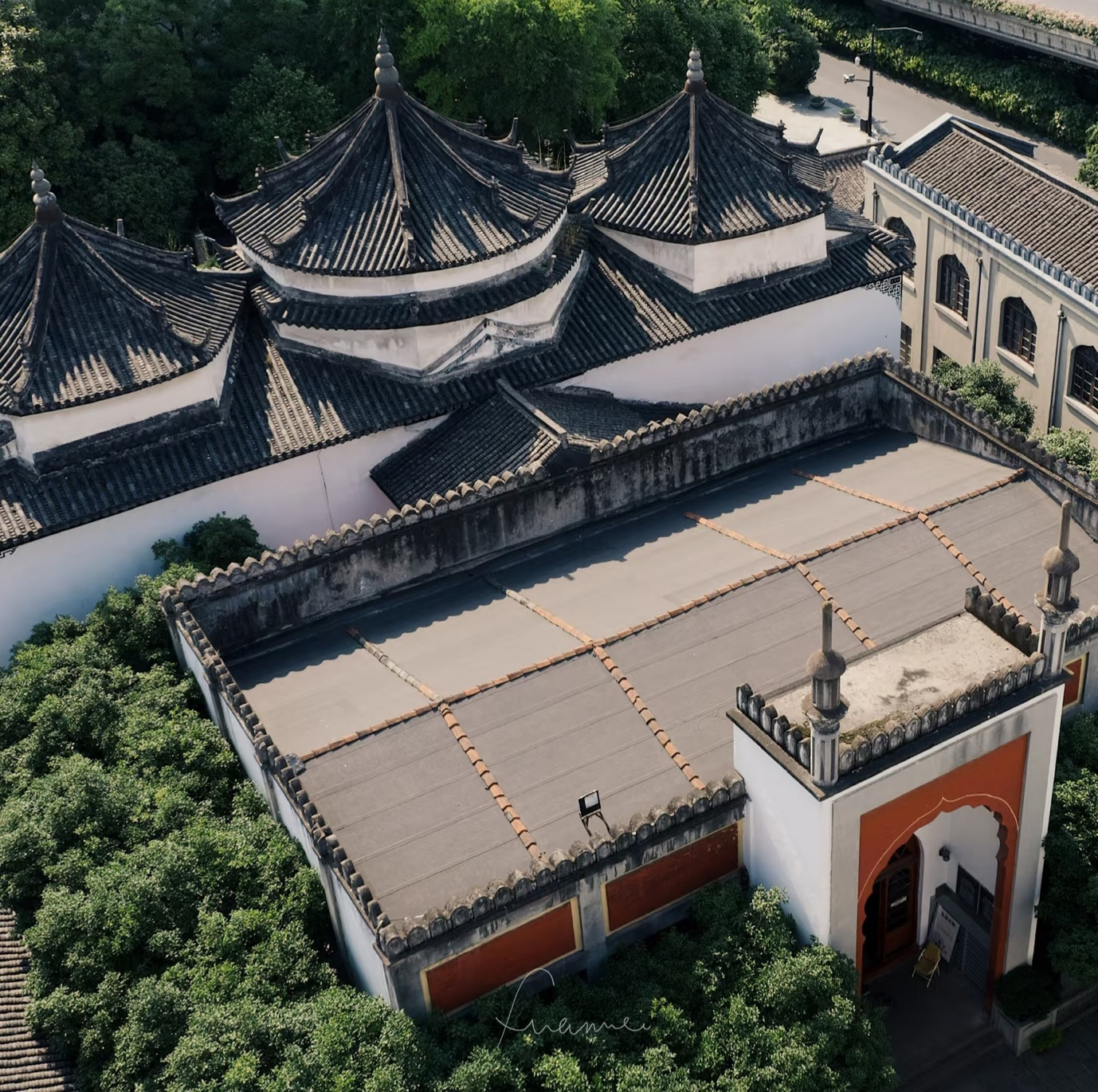
Phoenix Mosque in Hangzhou (est. 1281)

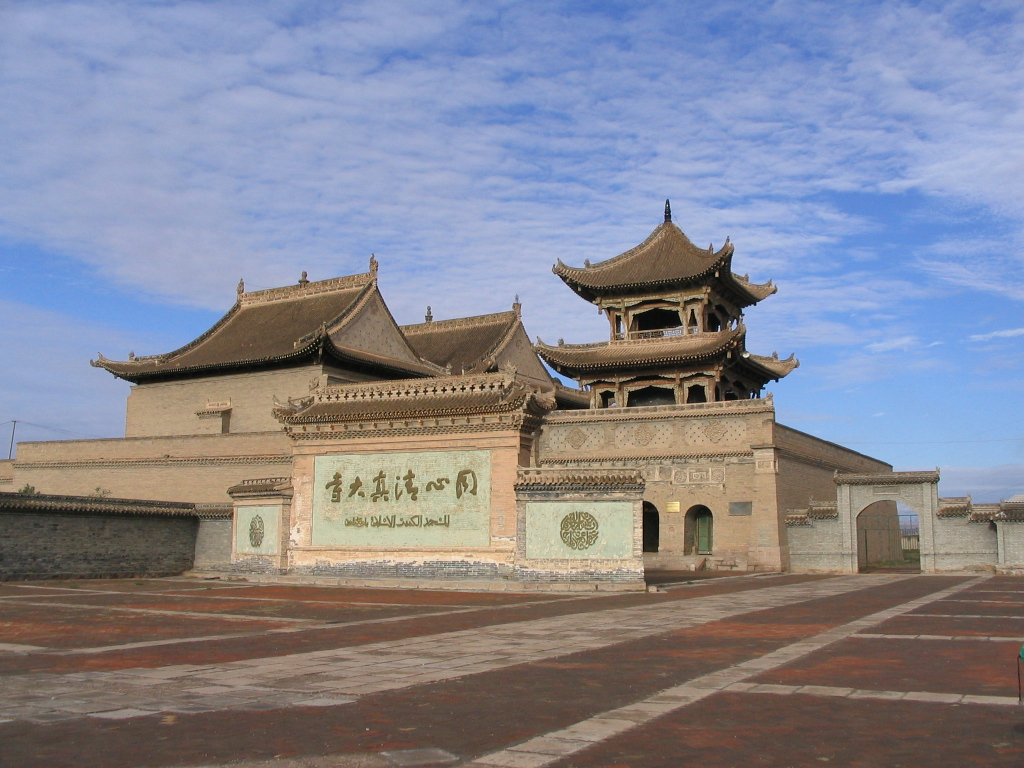
Tongxin Great Mosque (ca.1400)

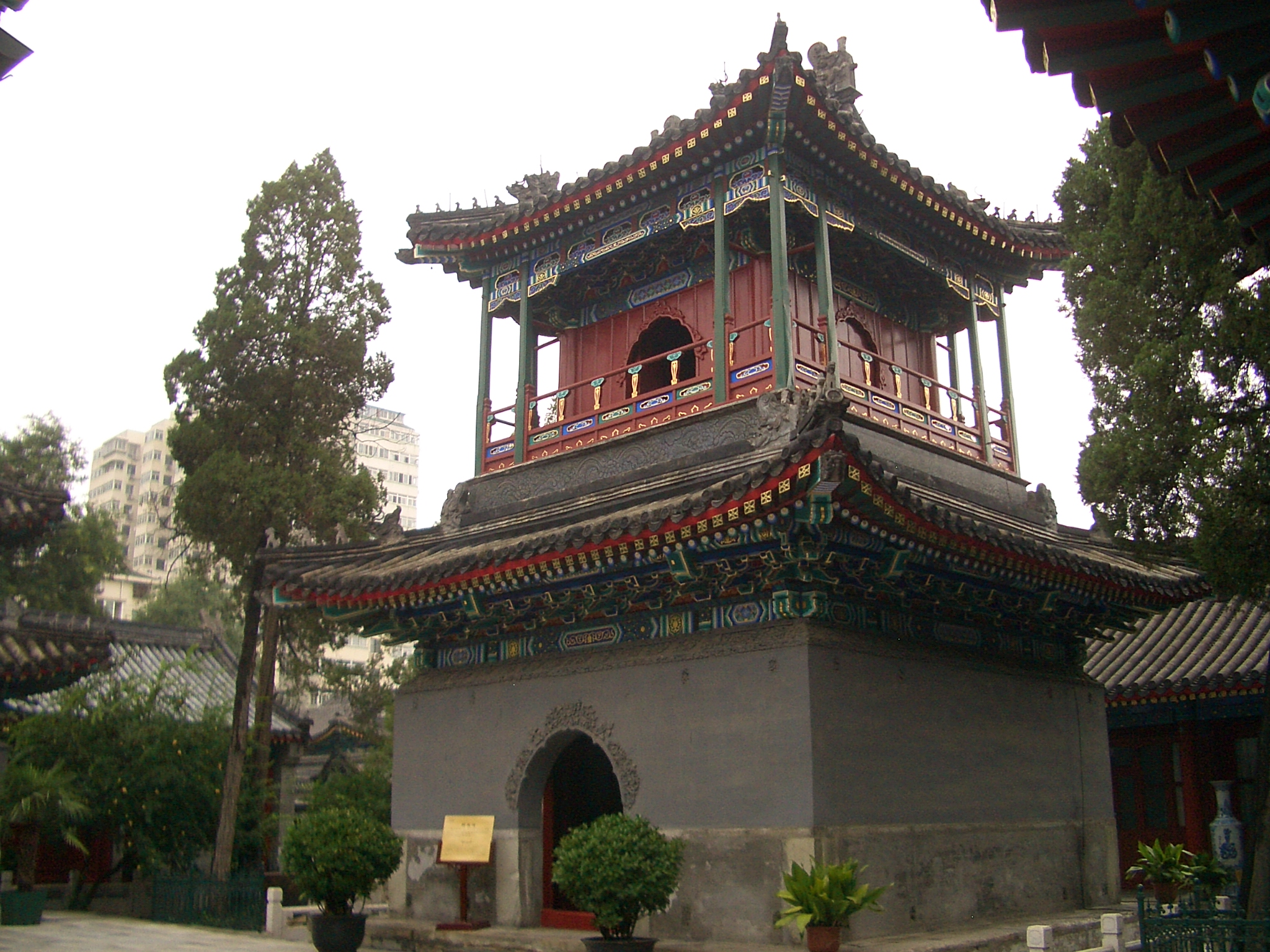
Minaret of the Niujie Mosque in Beijing (Est. 996)

=== Volga Tatar ===
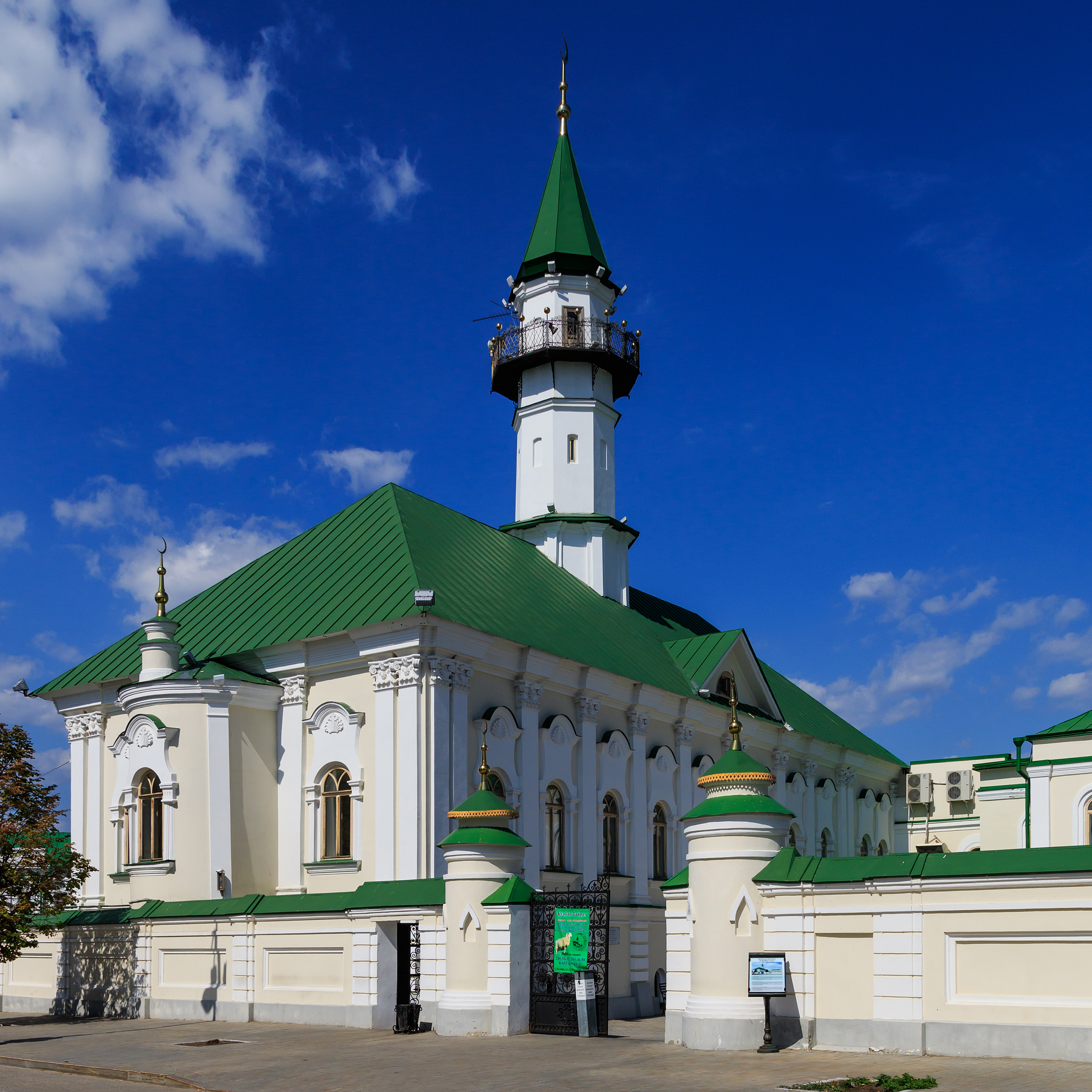
Marjani Mosque in Kazan, Tatarstan, Russia (1770)

Tatar architecture has evolved through the periods of the Golden Horde, the Tatar khanates and under the rule of the Russian Empire. Many traditional Tatar mosques built by the Volga Tatars have a gabled roof and a minaret placed in the center of the mosque, above the roof, rather than at the side or corner of the building. Examples of such mosques survive from the 18th and 19th centuries and were restored in modern times. This style is also found among the wooden mosques of the Lithuanian Tatars, whose mosque architecture was influenced by the Kazan (Volga) Tatars. Another type of mosque, with a domed roof and a minaret standing above the entrance, appeared in the mid-19th century.

=== Sahel and West Africa ===
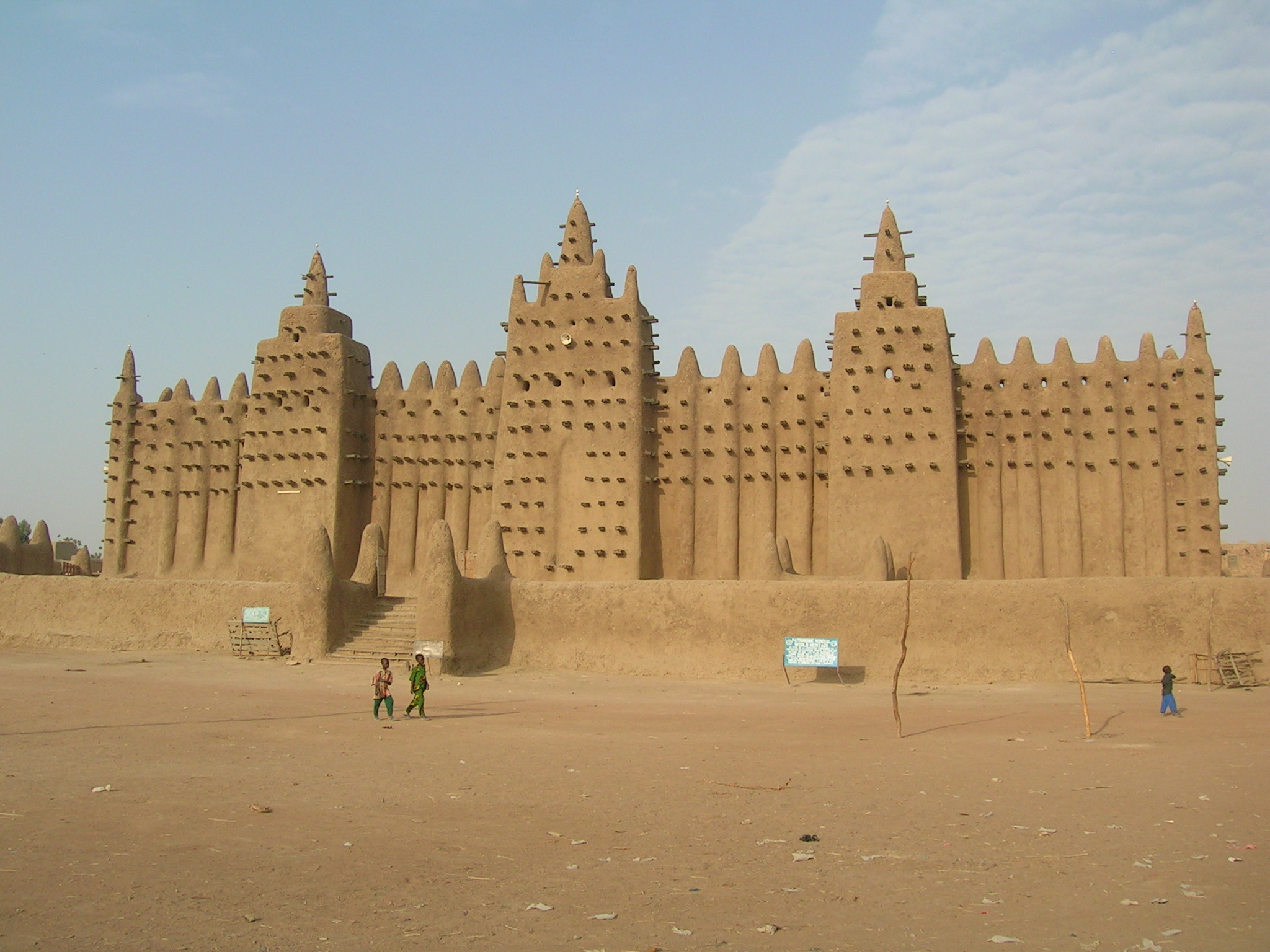
Great Mosque of Djenné in Mali (c. 1907), a large mud-brick building in "Neo-Sudanese" style

In West Africa, Muslim merchants played a vital role in the western Sahel region since the 9th century through trans-Saharan trade networks. While the Islamic architecture of this region shares a certain style, a wide variety of materials and local styles are evident across this wide geographic range. In the more arid western Sahara and northern Sahel regions, stone predominates as a building material and is often associated with Berber cultures. In the southern Sahel and savannah regions mud-brick and rammed earth are the main material and is now associated with the most monumental examples of West African Islamic architecture. In some places, like Timbuktu and Oualata, both building materials are used together, with stone constructions either covered or bound with a mud plaster.

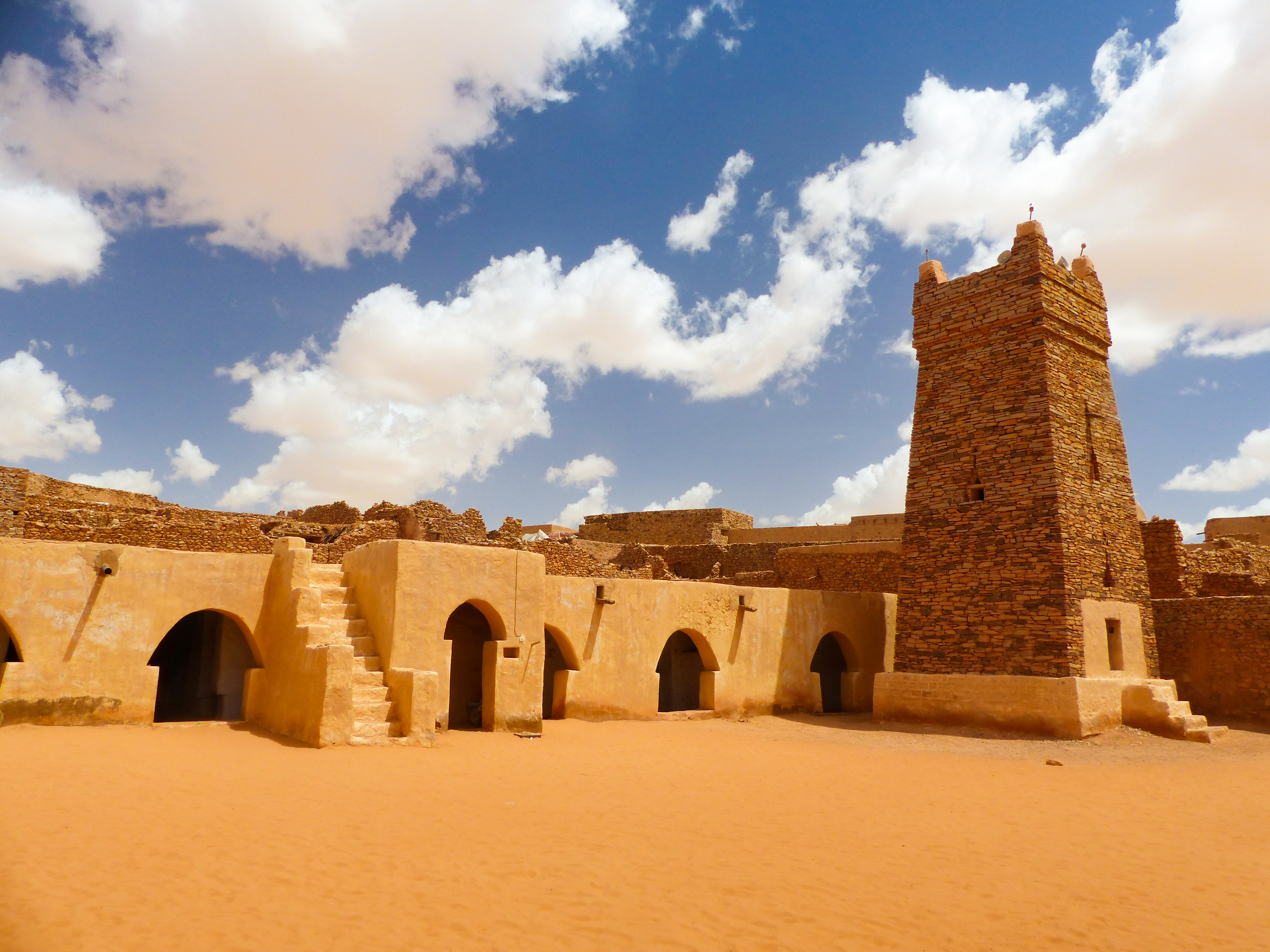
Chinguetti Mosque in Mauritania (13th century), built of sandstone with a flat wooden roof

The earliest mosques discovered in sub-Saharan Africa are at Kumbi Saleh (in present-day southern Mauritania), the former capital of the Ghana Empire. Here, a mosque has been discovered which consisted of a courtyard, a prayer hall, and a square minaret, built in dry stone covered in red mud used as plaster. On both the exterior and interior of the mosque, this plaster was painted with floral, geometric, and epigraphic motifs. A similar stone mosque from the same period has been found at Awdaghust. Both mosques are dated generally between the 9th and 14th centuries. At Kumbi Saleh, locals lived in domed-shaped dwellings in the king's section of the city, surrounded by a great enclosure. Traders lived in stone houses in a section which possessed 12 mosques (as described by Al-Bakri), one centered on Friday prayer.

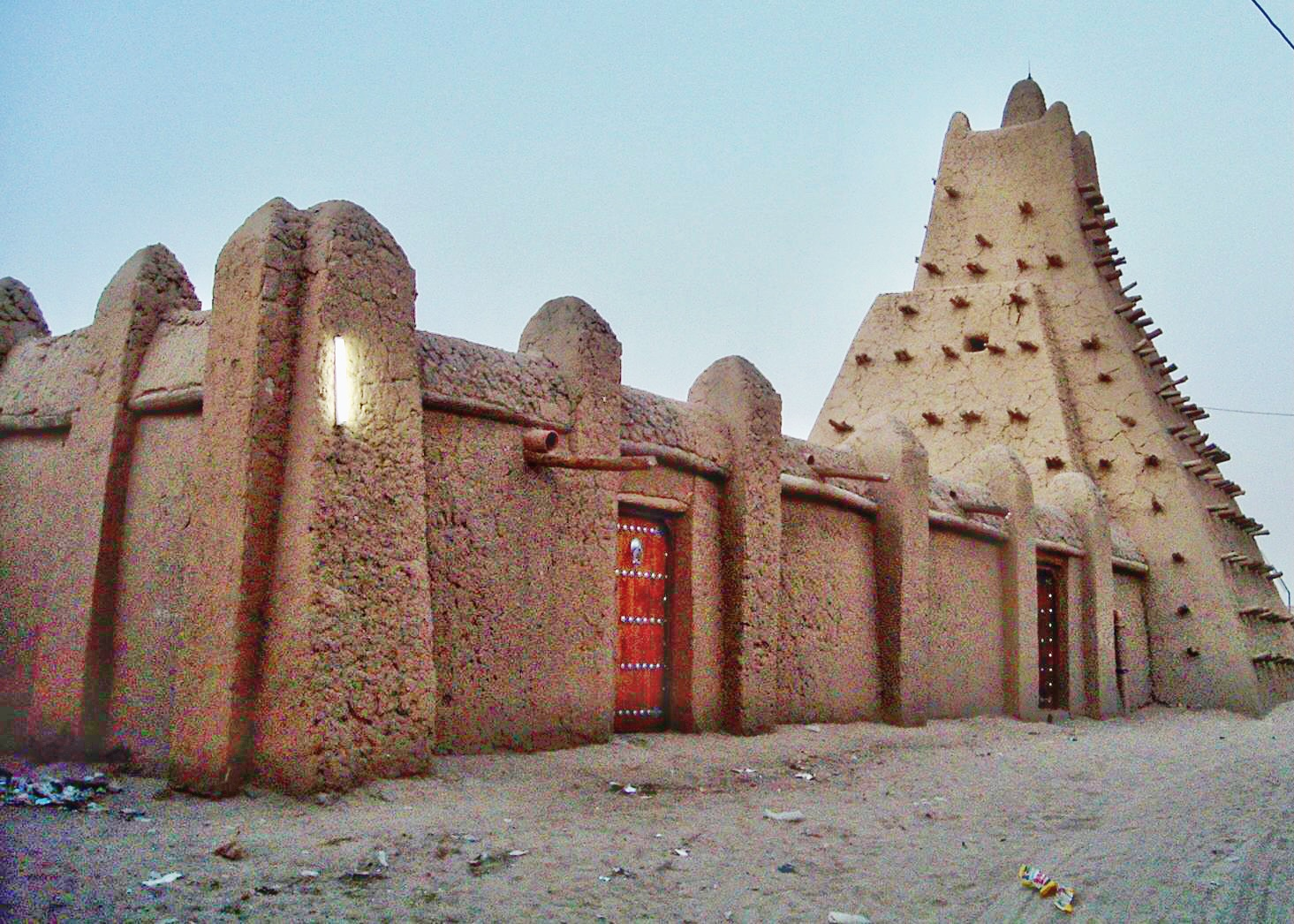
Sankore Mosque in Timbuktu (16th century with later renovations)

As Islamization progressed across the region, more variations developed in mosque architecture, including the adoption of traditional local forms not previously associated with Islamic architecture. Under Songhai influence, minarets took on a more pyramidal appearance and became stepped or tiered on three levels, as exemplified by the tower of the mosque–tomb of Askia al-Hajj Muhammad in Gao (present-day Mali). In Timbuktu, the Sankoré Mosque (established in the 14th-15th centuries and rebuilt in the 16th century, with later additions), had a tapering minaret and a prayer hall with rows of arches. The presence of tapering minarets may also reflect cultural contacts with M'zab region to the north, while decoration found at Timbuktu may reflect contacts with Berber communities in what is now Mauritania.

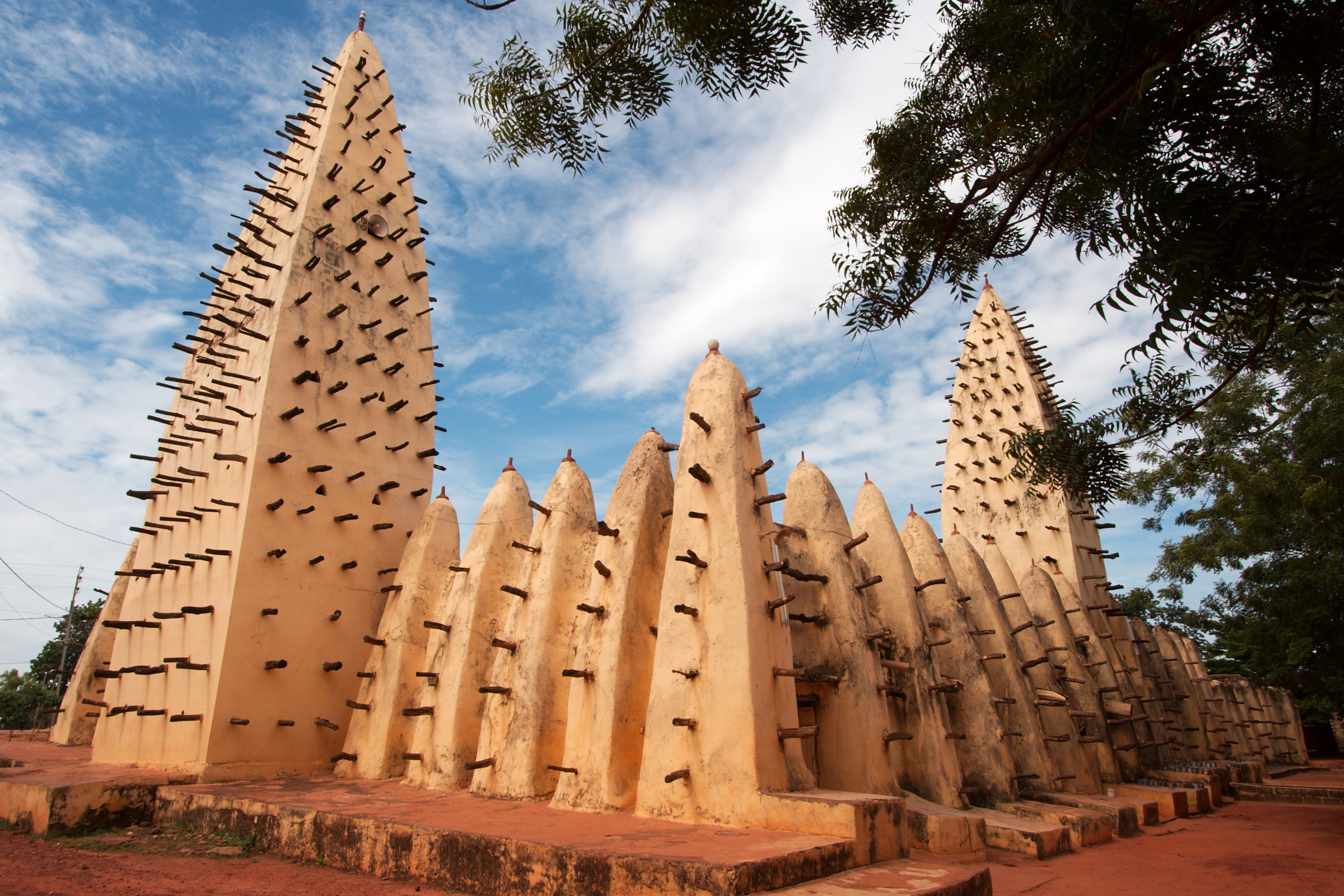
Grand Mosque of Bobo-Dioulasso in Burkina Faso (built 1817–1832, with later renovations)

In the earthen (mud) architecture of the region, scholar Andrew Petersen distinguishes two main styles: a "western" style that may have its roots in Djenné (present-day Mali), and an "eastern" style associated with Hausa architecture that may have its roots in Kano (present-day Nigeria). The eastern or Hausa style is generally more plain on the exterior of buildings, but is characterized by diverse interior decoration and the much greater use of wood. Mosques often have prayer halls with pillars supporting flat or slightly domed roofs of wood and mud. An exceptional example is the 19th-century Great Mosque of Zaria (present-day Nigeria), which has parabolic arches and a roof of shallow domes. The western or "Sudan" style is characterized by more elaborate and decorated exterior façades whose compositions emphasize verticality. They have tapering buttresses with cone-shaped summits, mosques have a large tower over the mihrab, and wooden stakes (toron) are often embedded in the walls – used for scaffolding but possibly also for some symbolic purpose.

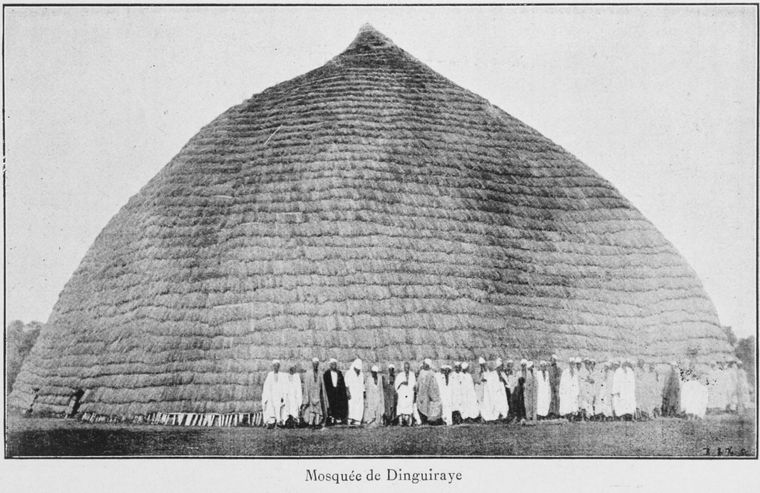
The "circular" mosque of Dinguiraye in Guinea, first built in 1850, a hybrid of traditional mosque and local hut architecture (photo circa 1900)

More hybrid styles also arose further south and on the edge of Islamized areas. In the Fouta Djallon region, in the Guinea Highlands, mosques were built with a traditional rectangular or square layout, but then covered by a huge conical thatched roof which protects from the rain. This type of roof was an existing feature of the traditional circular huts inhabited by the locals, re-adapted to cover new rectangular mosques when the mostly Muslim Fula people settled the region in the 18th century. A good example is the Friday mosque of Dinguiraye in Guinea, built in 1850 (with later restorations). Many others are attested in the same region overlapping with southern Senegal, western Mali, and Burkina Faso.

During the French colonial occupation of the Sahel, French engineers and architects had a role in popularizing a "Neo-Sudanese" style based on local traditional architecture but emphasizing symmetry and monumentality. The Great Mosque of Djenné, which was previously established in the 14th century but demolished in the early 19th century, was rebuilt in 1906–1907 under the direction of Ismaila Traoré and with guidance from French engineers. Now the largest earthen building in sub-Saharan Africa, it served as a model for the new style and for other mosques in the region, including the Grand Mosque of Mopti built by the French administration in 1935. Other 20th-century and more recent mosques in West Africa have tended to replicate a more generic style similar to that of modern Egypt.

=== East Africa ===
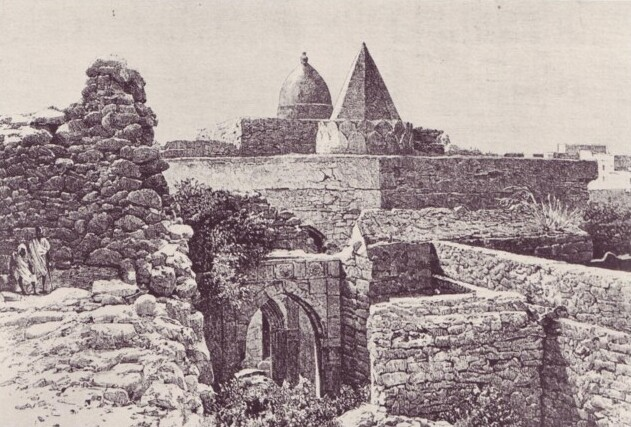
The 13th-century Fakhr al-Din Mosque in Mogadishu

East African architecture lacks some features typical of Islamic architecture, such as the construction of hammams. Historic mosques were generally rectangular in plan, lacked courtyards, and featured side rooms. Along the East African coast, common construction materials included coral stone, sundried bricks, and limestone. in the Somali coastal towns, local architecture reflected a certain degree of influence from Islamic architecture in other regions. New buildings were often built on the ruins of older structures, a practice that continued for centuries.

The oldest known mosques in the region were excavated at Shanga in present-day Kenya, where a succession of mosques on one site were built and rebuilt from the 9th to 14th centuries. Other early mosques include the Great Mosque of Kilwa (described below), the Kizimkazi Mosque in Zanzibar (rebuilt in the 18th century over 12th foundations), and three 13th-century mosques in Mogadishu. Ruins of early mosques and other structures are also found at Gedi.

The Fakhr al-Din Mosque in Mogadishu, dated to 1269, is the most architecturally sophisticated mosque in East Africa. It consists of a courtyard leading to a square hypostyle prayer of nine bays, with a dome over the central bay which resembles the conical domes of Anatolian Seljuk architecture. The mihrab is carved from marble from northern India. It also features the oldest known minaret in East Africa, a feature which did not become common in the region until the 19th century.

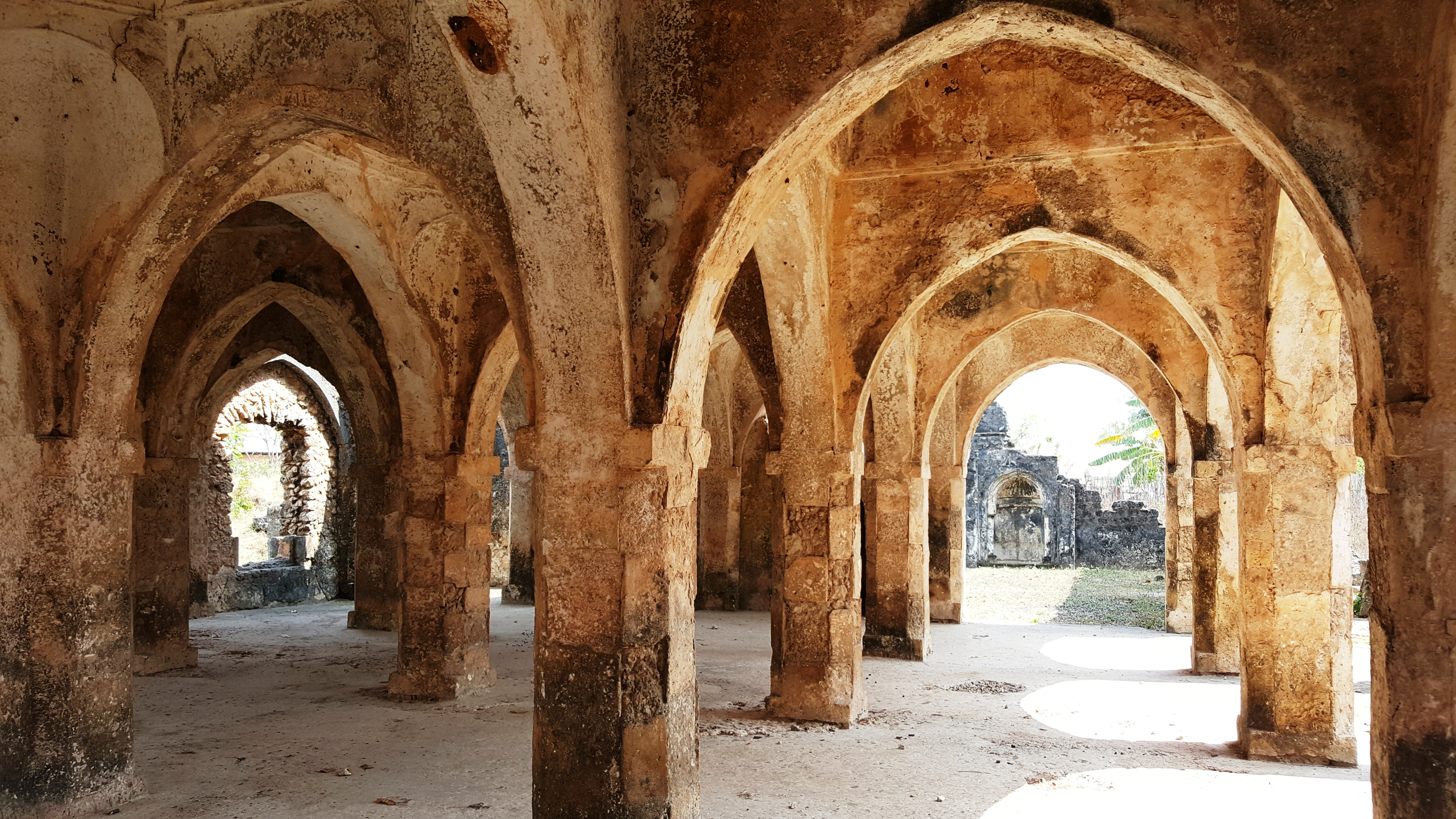
Interior of the Great Mosque of Kilwa

Kilwa, off the coast of Tanzania, hosts the remains of multiple historic mosques and palaces. The Great Mosque is most impressive, the largest in East Africa before the 19th century. It was built and modified in multiple phases, with the oldest surviving section dating possibly to the 11th century, to which was later added a courtyard with porticos of coral stone columns and a side chamber with the largest historic dome on the East African coast (5 meters in diameter). The courtyard is the only known medieval example of its kind in the region, though it was rebuilt and covered with domes and barrel vaults in the 15th century.

Apart from mosques, the most common type of historic building to have survived, even if only partially, are palaces. Monumental palaces have been excavated at Shanga and at Manda which date from before 1000 CE. The largest pre-19th-century palace along the coastal region is Husuni Kubwa at Kilwa, dating possibly to the 13th century, which has an imposing entrance and multiple sections arranged around internal courtyards. Starting in the early 19th century, the Omanis introduced a new type of palace with multiple stories.

== In modern times ==
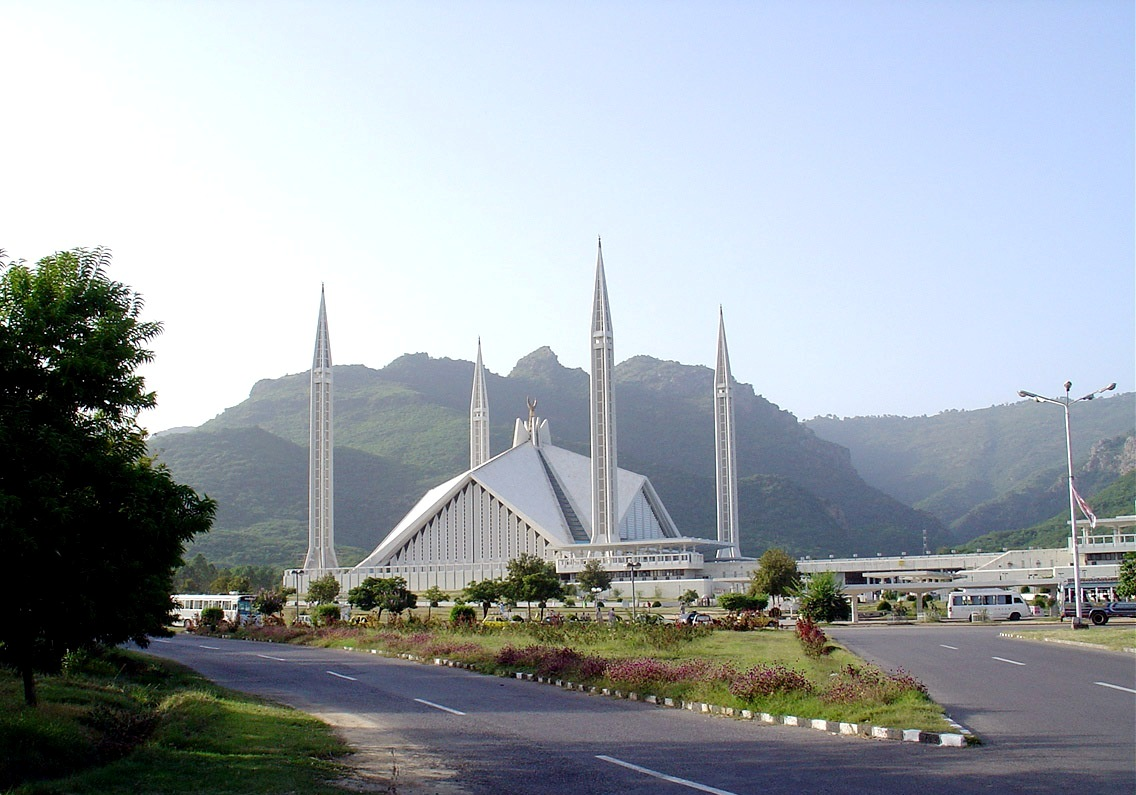
Faisal Mosque at Islamabad, Pakistan designed by Vedat Dalokay.

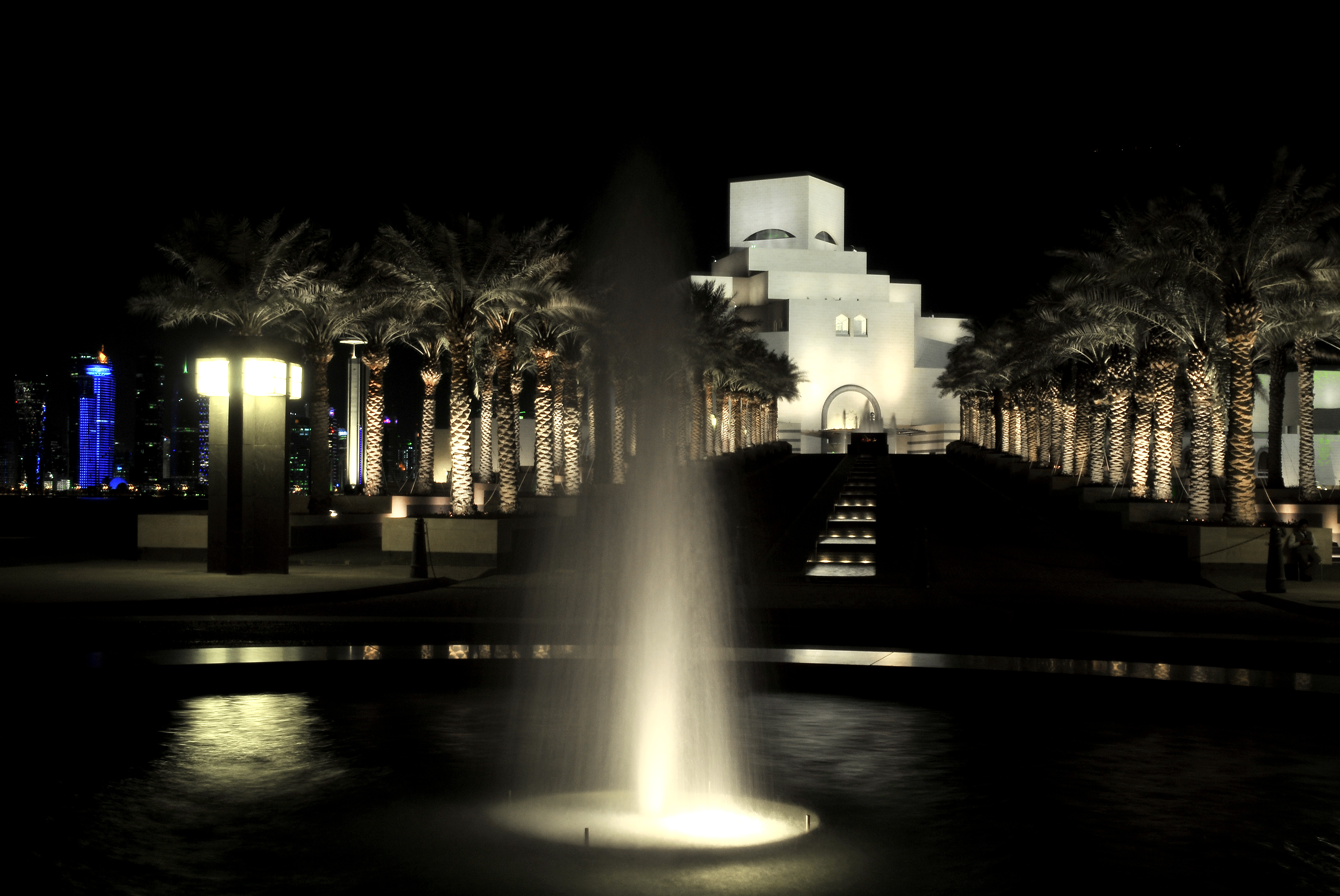
Museum of Islamic Art at Doha, Qatar designed by I. M. Pei.

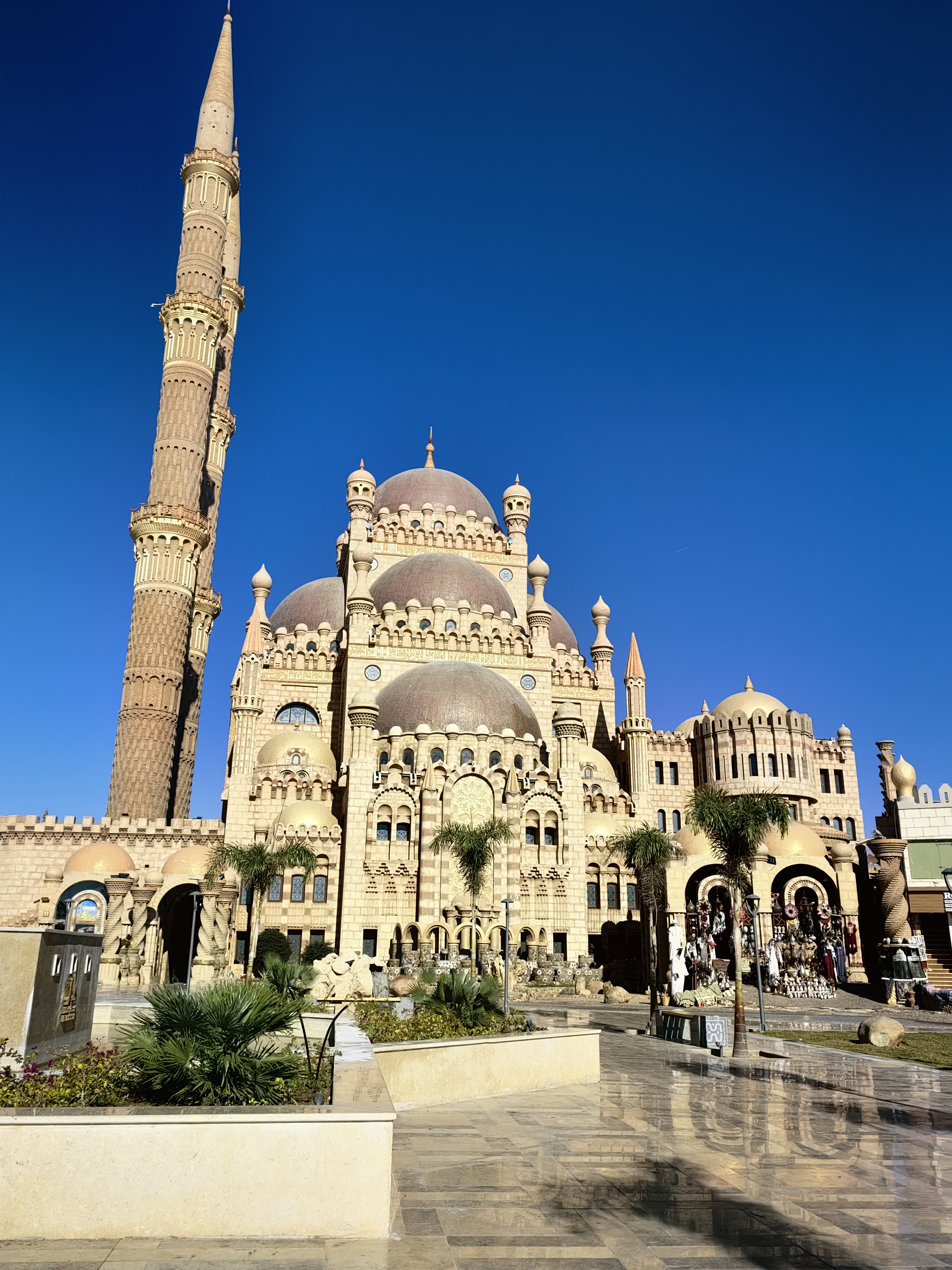
Al-Sahaba Mosque at Sharm El Sheikh, Egypt.

In modern times, the architecture of Islamic buildings, not just religious ones, has gone through some changes. The new architectural style doesn't stick with the same fundamental aspects that were seen in the past, but mosques for the most part still feature the same parts—the miḥrāb (مِـحْـرَاب), the minarets, four-iwan plan, and the pishtaq. A difference to note is the appearance of mosques without domes, as in the past mosques for the most part all had them, but these new dome-less mosques seem to follow a function over form design, and are created by those not of the Islamic faith, in most cases. The influence of Islam still pervades the style of creation itself, and provides a 'conceptual framework', for the making of a building that exemplifies the styles and beliefs of Islam. It has also been influenced by the now meeting of many different cultures, such as European styles meeting Islamic styles, leading to Islamic architects incorporating features of other architectural and cultural styles.

=== Urban design and Islam ===
Urban design and the tradition of Islamic styled architecture have begun to combine to form a new 'neo-Islamic' style, where the efficiency of the urban style meshes with the spirituality and aesthetic characteristics of Islamic styles. Islamic Architecture in itself is a style that showcases the values and the culture of Islam, but in modern times sticking to tradition is falling out of practice, so a combination style formed. Examples showing this are places such as the Marrakesh Menara Airport, the Islamic Cultural Center and Museum of Tolerance, Masjid Permata Qolbu, the concept for The Vanishing Mosque, and the Mazar-e-Quaid. All of these buildings show the influence of Islam over them, but also the movements of things like minimalism which are rising to popularity in the architectural field. Designers that use the aspects of both modern styles and the Islamic styles found a way to have the Western-inspired modernism with the classical cultural aspects of Islamic architecture. This concept though brings up the controversy of the identity of the traditional Islamic community within a space that doesn't follow the way they knew it.

=== Debates on status as a style of architecture ===
There are some who also debate whether Islamic architecture can truly be called a style, as the religious aspect is seen as separate and having no bearing on the architectural style, while on the other side people also argue that the newfound trend and divergence from the style of old Islamic Architecture is what is causing the style to lose its status. There are scholars that also believe that the distinguishing features of the Islamic architecture style were not necessarily found within the architecture, but were rather environmental markers, such as the sounds of prayer, the city around it, the events that occurred there. The example given is that we can only truly know that a building is a mosque by what happens there, rather than by visual cues. Specific features that are notably related to Islamic architecture – the mihrab, the minaret, and the gate – are seen in multiple locations and do not always serve the same use, and symbolism for being Islamic in nature is seen to be demonstrated more culturally than it is architecturally. Islamic architecture is also sometimes referred to as a 'hidden architecture', one that doesn't necessarily show the physical traits of the style, rather it is something that is experienced.

=== Contemporary Muslim architects ===
- Fazlur Khan
- Abdel-Wahed El-Wakil
- Vedat Dalokay
- Kamran Afshar Naderi
- Abdulhusein M. Thariani
- Muzharul Islam
- Nabih Youssef
- Bashirul Haq
- Zaha Hadid
- Nayyar Ali Dada
- Habib Fida Ali
- Hassan Fathy

== Connections and deeper meanings ==
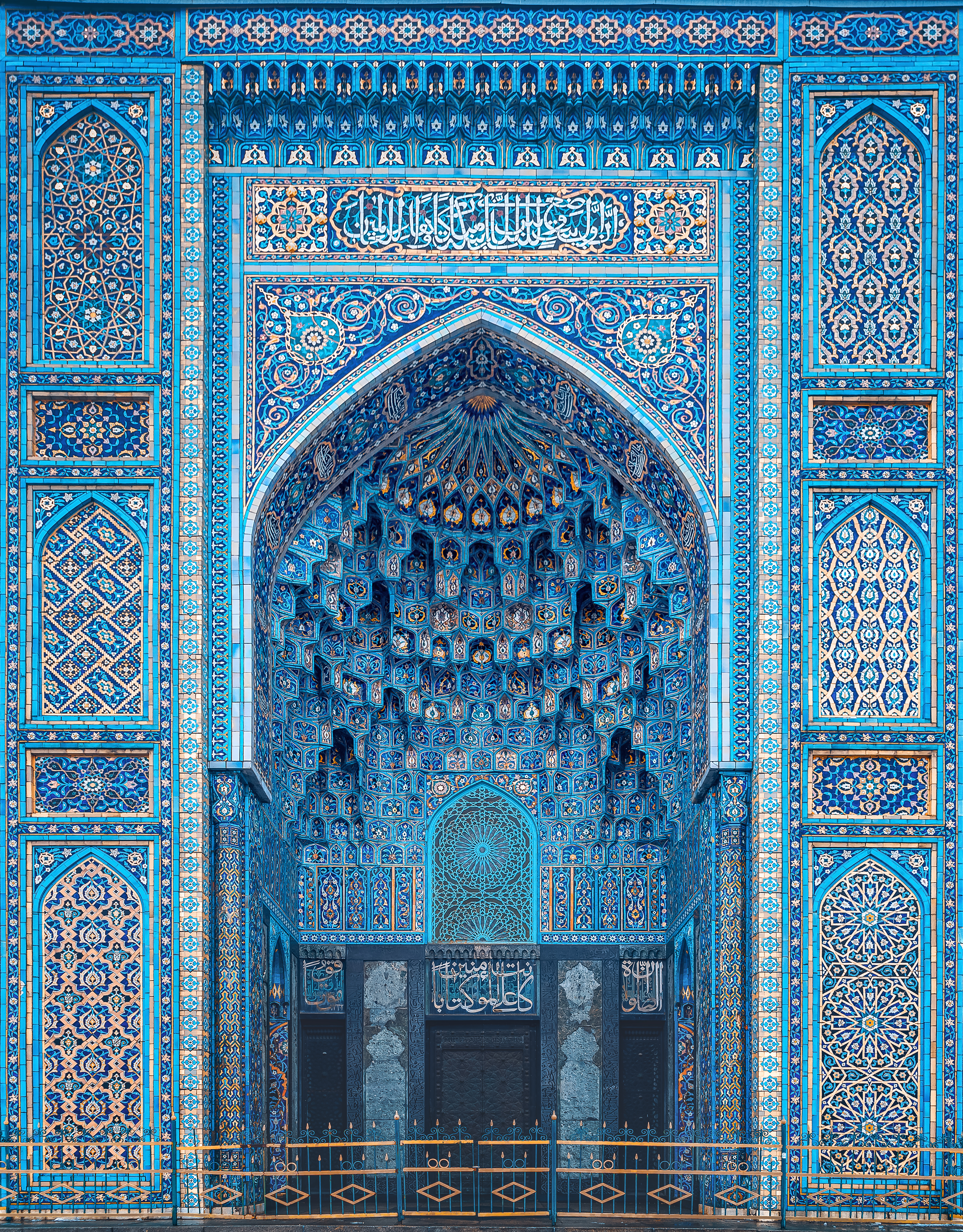
Islamic geometric patterns in Saint Petersburg, Russia

=== Difficulty forming connections ===
Islamic architecture is a neglected subject within historical studies of world architecture. Many scholars that study historical architecture often gloss over, if not completely ignore Islamic structures. This is caused by multiple elements, one being that there are little historic literary works that express an Islamic architect's motives with their structures. Due to the wide geographic range of the Islamic religion, there is a large variation between thousands of existing mosques with little consistency between them. Lastly, since it is against the Islamic faith to idolize earthly beings, any depictions of earthly beings lack religious connection. These characteristics combine to make it difficult for historians to form symbolic connections from architecture in Islamic places of worship. Some authors have attempted to ascribe mystical or mathematical symbolisms to various aspects Islamic architecture. However, while these symbolic meanings may be plausible for certain specific buildings, they are not necessarily applicable to the rest of Islamic architecture.

=== Religious and societal connections ===
Unlike Christianity, Islamic art tends to not depict living beings because it is viewed as a conflict with the Qur'an. From an Islamic viewpoint, anything created by God is under his order and thus should not be idolized. This leaves typical religious Western symbols out of the picture, and replaces them with an emphasis on complex geometrical shapes and patterns.

There are several aspects of Islamic architecture that to modern knowledge lack a symbolic religious meaning, but there are connections that do exist. A repeated and significant motif in mosques is calligraphy. Calligraphy plays a huge role in delivering religious connections through artistic design. Calligraphy, in a mosque setting, is specifically used to reference excerpts from both the Qur'an and Muhammad's teachings. These references are one of the few religious connections architects include within their work.

==== Status and hierarchy ====
Islamic architecture varies vastly across the world. Specifically, some mosques have different goals and intentions than others. These intentions often highlighted religious and social hierarchies within the mosque. Mosques are designed to have the least significant portions of the layout closest to the entrance, as people move deeper into the building more significant religious areas are revealed. Hierarchy is also present because certain Islamic architects are tasked to design specifically for the presence of royalty, although in Islamic belief all Muslims in the mosque are equal. Designated locations had been carefully chosen in the mosque to highlight an individual's position in society. This emphasis could be made by being within view to all attendees, by being placed in the focal point of artistry, or with a maqsurah.

Maintaining a sociological hierarchy within a mosque would typically represent a recognition by a higher being aware of a delegation of power. This hierarchy does exist but not with any sort of religious message as Hillenbrand points out, "in neither case is this hierarchy employed for especially portentous ends." Hierarchy exists in the church in different forms, but is meant for purely functional purposes.

=== Structural intentions ===
Deeper meanings in Islamic architecture often take form as functional purposes. For example, mosques are built around the idea that it should not just be a place of mesmerizing aesthetics, but a place where the aesthetics' fluidity guide the person into proper worship.

A key feature of the mosque is the mihrab, a universal part of any Islamic place of worship. The mihrab is easily identifiable through a receding wall and a gable overhead often consisting of intricate patterns. Upon entering, the most crucial religious function the architecture of the mosque serves to deliver is the qibla. The qibla is necessary for proper Islamic worship, and is revealed through architectural means.

== See also ==
- Archnet, database of Islamic architecture
- Gozo Farmhouse
- Turbah
- Well House
