= Sultan of Egypt =

Status held by the rulers of Egypt, 1174–1922

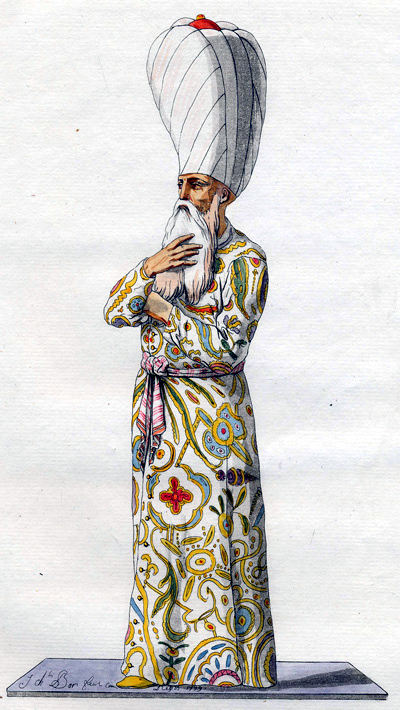
- 1799 painting of a counsellor to the Sultan

Details
- Style: His Majesty
- Formed: 1174; Precursor: Pharaoh
- Abolished: 15 March 1805; Successor: Khedive of Egypt
- Residences: Cairo Citadel, Cairo, Egypt
- Appointer: Hereditary

Medieval Egypt was ruled by sultans from the establishment of the Ayyubid dynasty in 1174 until the Ottoman conquest of Egypt in 1517. Though the extent of the sultanate ebbed and flowed, it generally included Sham and Hejaz, with the consequence that the Ayyubid and later Mamluk sultans were also regarded as the sultans of Syria. From 1914, the title was once again used by the heads of the Muhammad Ali dynasty of Egypt, being replaced by the title of king of Egypt in 1922.

== Ayyubid dynasty ==
Prior to the rise of Saladin, Egypt was the center of the Shia Fatimid Caliphate, the only period in Islamic history when a caliphate was ruled by members of the Shia branch of Islam. The Fatimids had long sought to completely supplant the Sunni Abbasid Caliphate based in Iraq, and like their Abbasid rivals, they also took the title caliph, representing their claim to the highest status within the Islamic hierarchy. However, with Saladin's rise to power in 1169, Egypt returned to the Sunni fold and the Abbasid Caliphate. Recognizing the Abbasid caliph as his theoretical superior, Saladin took the title of sultan in 1174, though from this point until the Ottoman conquest, supreme power in the caliphate rested with the sultan of Egypt.

== Mamluk dynasties ==
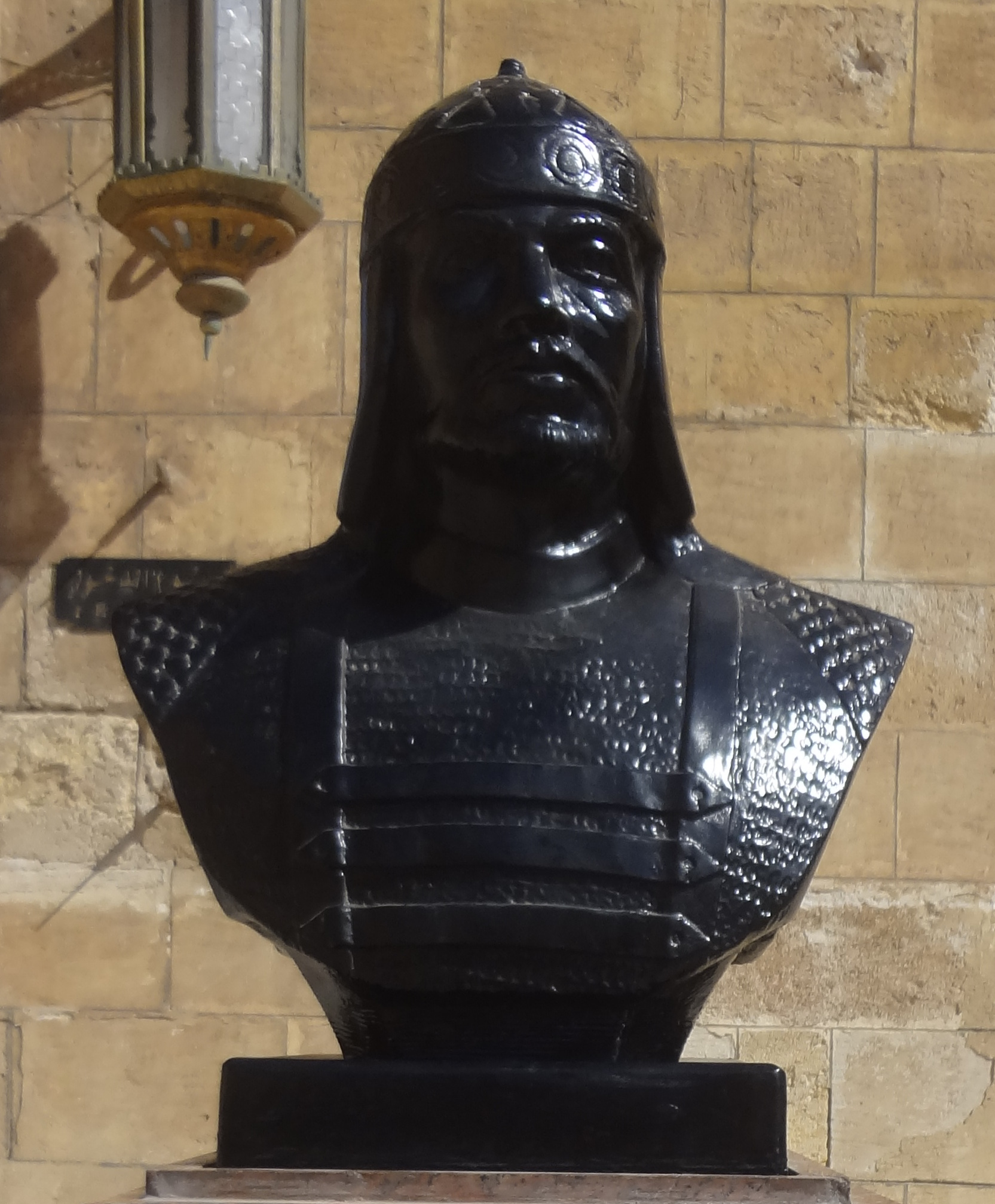
Statue of Egyptian Sultan Baybars (1260–1277)

In 1250, the Ayyubids were overthrown by the Mamluks, who established the Bahri dynasty and whose rulers also took the title sultan. Notable Bahri sultans include Qutuz, who defeated the invading Mongol army of Hulagu at the Battle of Ain Jalut, and Baibars, who finally recaptured the last remnants of the Crusader Kingdom of Jerusalem. The Bahri were later overthrown by a rival Mameluke group, who established the Burji dynasty in 1382.

== Egypt Eyalet and autonomous Khedivate ==
The Ottoman conquest of Egypt in 1517 ended the Egyptian Sultanate, with Egypt henceforth a province of the Ottoman Empire. It also marked the end of the Mamluk Abbasid dynasty, as the Ottomans captured the current Caliph Al-Mutawakkil III, and forced him to relinquish the title to the Ottoman Sultan Selim I. The Ottomans subsequently paid little interest to Egyptian affairs, and the Mamelukes rapidly regained most of their power within Egypt. However, they remained vassals of the Ottoman Sultan and their leaders were limited to the title of Bey.

In 1523, the Ottoman-appointed Turkish governor of Egypt, Hain Ahmed Pasha, declared himself the Sultan of Egypt and Egypt independent from the Ottoman Empire. He struck his own coins to legitimize his rule, but soon thereafter, Ottoman forces under Pargalı Ibrahim Pasha captured him and executed him, with Ibrahim Pasha assuming the governorship until he found a more permanent replacement, Hadım Süleyman Pasha.

Following the defeat of Napoleon I's forces in 1801, Muhammad Ali Pasha seized power, overthrowing the Mamelukes, and declaring himself ruler of Egypt. In 1805, the Ottoman Sultan Selim III reluctantly recognized him as Wāli under Ottoman suzerainty. Muhammad Ali, however, styled himself as Khedive, and though technically a vassal of the Ottoman Empire, governed Egypt as if it were an independent state. Seeking to rival and ultimately supplant the Ottoman Sultan, Muhammad Ali implemented a rapid modernization and militarization program, and expanded Egypt's borders south into Sudan and north into Syria. Eventually, he waged war on the Ottoman Empire with the intention of overthrowing the ruling Osman Dynasty and replacing it with his own. Though the intervention of the Great Powers prevented Muhammad Ali from realizing his grandiose ambitions of becoming sultan himself, obliging Egypt to remain technically part of the Ottoman Empire, Egypt's autonomy survived his death with the Porte recognizing the Muhammad Ali Dynasty as hereditary rulers of the country.

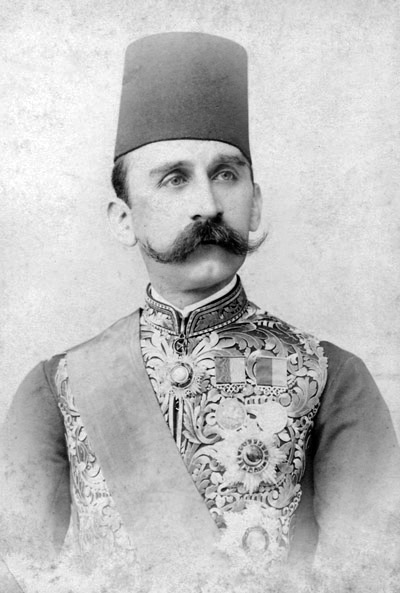
Hussein Kamel, Sultan of Egypt, 1914–1917.

Muhammad Ali's grandson, Ismail I, acceded to the Egyptian throne in 1863 and immediately set about achieving his grandfather's aims, though in a less confrontation manner. A combination of growing Egyptian power, deteriorating Ottoman strength, and outright bribery led to Ottoman Sultan Abdulaziz formally recognizing the Egyptian ruler as Khedive in 1867. As Ismail expanded Egypt's borders in Africa, and the Ottoman Empire continued to decay, Ismail believed he was close to realizing formal Egyptian independence, and even contemplated using the opening of the Suez Canal in 1869 to declare himself Sultan of Egypt. He was persuaded otherwise by pressure from the Great Powers, who feared the consequences of further disintegration of Ottoman power. Ultimately, Ismail's reign ended in failure, due to the massive debt his ambitious projects had incurred. European and Ottoman pressure forced his removal in 1879 and replacement by his far more pliant son Tewfik. The subsequent Orabi Revolt resulted in Great Britain invading Egypt in 1882 on the invitation of Khedive Tewfik, and beginning its decades long occupation of the country.

== Restoration of Egyptian Sultanate ==
From 1882 onwards, Egypt's status became deeply convoluted: officially a province of the Ottoman Empire, semi-officially a virtually independent state with its own monarchy, armed forces, and territorial possessions in Sudan, and for practical purposes a British puppet. The legal fiction of Ottoman sovereignty in Egypt was finally ended in 1914 when the Ottoman Empire joined the Central Powers in First World War. Alarmed that the anti-British Khedive Abbas II would side with the Ottomans, the British deposed him in favor of his uncle Hussein Kamel and declared Egypt a British protectorate. Symbolizing the official end of Ottoman rule, Hussein Kamel took the title Sultan as did his brother Fuad I who succeeded him in 1917, though in reality Egypt remained under British domination. Both Hussein Kamel and Fuad maintained Egypt's claim to Sudan, with Egyptian nationalists declaring both in turn to be the "Sultan of Egypt and Sudan".

Rising nationalist anger at the continued British occupation forced Britain to formally recognize Egyptian independence, in 1922. However, the title of Sultan was dropped and replaced with King. Nationalist leader Saad Zaghlul, who was later exiled by the British, maintained that this was because the British refused to recognize a sovereign Egyptian ruler who outranked their own king (in the hierarchy of titles, sultan, like shah in Iran, is comparable to emperor, being a sovereign who recognizes no secular superior). Another reason offered for the change in title is that it reflected the growing secularization of Egypt at the time, as sultan has Islamic overtones, whereas the Arabic word for king, malik, does not.

Upon overthrowing Fuad's son, King Farouk I, in the Egyptian revolution of 1952, the Free Officers briefly considered declaring his infant son Sultan to reinforce Egypt's sovereignty over Sudan and demonstrate their rejection of British occupation. However, since the revolutionaries had already decided to abolish the Egyptian monarchy after a brief period of consolidating their hold on power, they determined that it would be an idle gesture and Farouk's son was duly declared King Fuad II. The following year, on 18 June 1953, the revolutionary government officially abolished the monarchy and Egypt became a republic.

== List of Sultans ==
=== Ayyubid Dynasty ===
- Saladin, general of Nur al-Din Zengi and vizier of Fatimid caliph al-Adid, 1171–1193
- al-Aziz Uthman, son of Saladin, 1193–1198
- al-Mansur Muhammad, son of al-Aziz Uthman, 1198–1200
- al-Adil I, brother of Saladin, 1200–1218
- al-Kamil, son of al-Adil I, 1218–1238
- al-Adil II, son of al-Kamil, 1238–1240
- as-Salih Ayyub, son of al-Kamil, 1240–1249
- al-Muazzam Turanshah, son of as-Salih Ayyub, 1249–1250
- al-Ashraf Musa, 1250–1254

=== Mamluk Sultans ===
- Shajar al-Durr, widow of as-Salih Ayyub, 1250
- al-Mu'izz Aybak, mamluk of as-Salih Ayyub, 1250, 1254–1257
- al-Mansur Ali, son of Aybak, 1257–1259
- al-Muzaffar Qutuz, mamluk of Aybak, 1259–1260
- al-Zahir Baybars, mamluk of as-Salih Ayyub, 1260–1277
- al-Sa'id Baraka, son of Baybars, 1277–1279
- al-Adil Salamish, son of Baybars, 1279
- al-Mansur Qalawun, mamluk of Aybak, 1279–1290
- al-Ashraf Khalil, son of Qalawun, 1290–1293
- an-Nasir Muhammad, son of Qalawun, 1293–1294, 1299–1309, 1310–1341
- al-Adil Kitbugha, mamluk of Qalawun, 1294–1296
- al-Mansur Lajin, mamluk of Qalawun, 1296–1299
- al-Muzaffar Baybars II, mamluk of Qalawun, 1309–1310
- al-Mansur Abu-Bakr, son of an-Nasir Muhammad, 1341
- al-Ashraf Kujuk, son of an-Nasir Muhammad, 1341–1342
- an-Nasir Ahmad, son of an-Nasir Muhammad, 1342
- as-Salih Ismail, son of an-Nasir Muhammad, 1342–1345
- al-Kamil Sha'ban, son of an-Nasir Muhammad, 1345–1346
- al-Muzaffar Hajji, son of an-Nasir Muhammad, 1346–1347
- an-Nasir Hasan, son of an-Nasir Muhammad, 1347–1351, 1354–1361
- as-Salih Salih, son of an-Nasir Muhammad, 1351–1354
- al-Mansur Muhammad, son of Hajji, 1361–1363
- al-Ashraf Sha'ban II, grandson of an-Nasir Muhammad, 1363–1377
- al-Mansur Ali II, son of Sha'ban II, 1377–1381
- as-Salih Hajji II, son of Sha'ban II, 1381-1382, 1389-1390
- al-Zahir Barquq, mamluk of Yalbugha al-Umari, 1382–1389, 1390–1399
- an-Nasir Faraj, son of Barquq, 1399–1405, 1405–1412
- al-Mansur Abd al-Aziz, son of Barquq, 1405
- al-Musta'in billah, Abbasid caliph, 1412
- al-Mu'ayyad Shaykh, mamluk of Barquq, 1412–1421
- al-Muzaffar Ahmad, son of Shaykh, 1421
- az-Zahir Tatar, mamluk of Barquq, 1421
- as-Salih Muhammad, son of Tatar, 1421–1422
- al-Ashraf Barsbay, mamluk of Barquq, 1422–1437
- al-Aziz Yusuf, son of Barsbay, 1437–1438
- az-Zahir Jaqmaq, mamluk of Barquq, 1438–1453
- al-Mansur Uthman, son of Jaqmaq, 1453
- al-Ashraf Inal, mamluk of Barquq, 1453–1461
- al-Mu'ayyad Ahmad, son of Inal, 1461
- az-Zahir Khushqadam, mamluk of Shaykh, 1461–1467
- az-Zahir Bilbay, mamluk of Shaykh, 1467
- az-Zahir Timurbugha, mamluk of Jaqmaq, 1467–1468
- al-Ashraf Qaitbay, mamluk of Barsbay, 1468–1496
- an-Nasir Muhammad, son of Qaitbay, 1496–1498
- az-Zahir Qansuh, mamluk of Qaitbay, 1498–1500
- al-Ashraf Janbalat, mamluk of Qaitbay, 1500–1501
- al-Adil Tuman Bay I, mamluk of Qaitbay, 1501
- al-Ashraf Qansuh II, mamluk of Qaitbay, 1501–1516
- al-Ashraf Tuman Bay II, mamluk of Qansuh II, 1516–1517

=== Hain Ahmed Pasha's Revolt (1523–1524) ===
- Hain Ahmed Pasha, Ottoman governor of Egypt, 1523–1524

=== Muhammad Ali dynasty (1914–1922) ===
- Hussein Kamel, son of Isma'il I, Khedive of Egypt, 1914–1917
- Fuad I, son of Isma'il I, 1917–1922

Regnal titles
Preceded by Caliph	Style of the Egyptian sovereign 1171–1517	Succeeded by Wāli
Preceded by Khedive	Style of the Egyptian sovereign 1914–1922	Succeeded by King of Egypt
