= List of Mamluk sultans =

Sultans of the Mamluk Sultanate
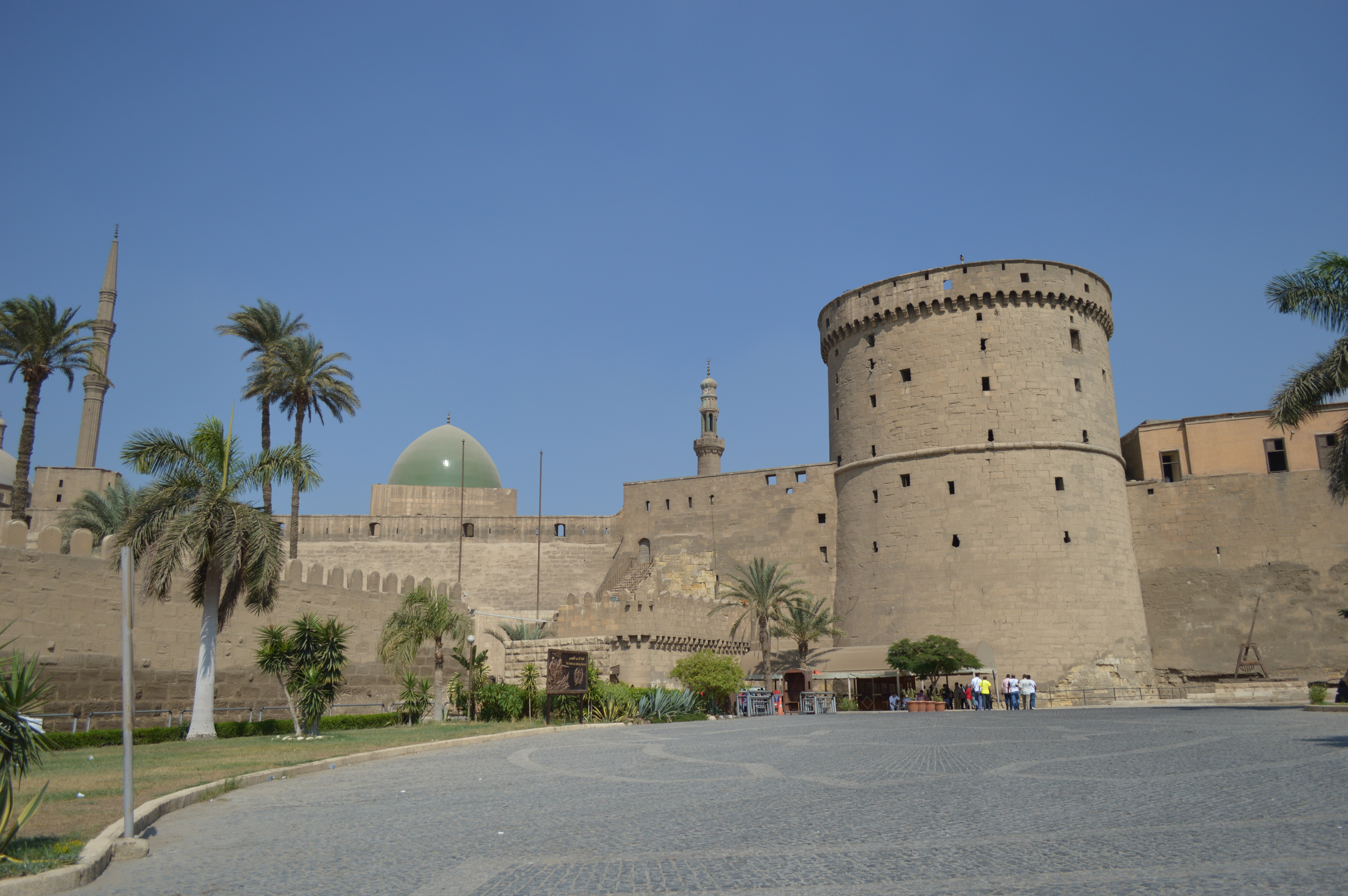
- The Cairo Citadel, the seat of Mamluk sultans

Details
- First monarch: Shajar al-Durr
- Last monarch: Tumanbay II
- Formed: 1250
- Abolished: 1517
- Residence: Cairo

The following is a list of Mamluk sultans of Egypt. The Mamluk Sultanate was founded in 1250 after the mamluks of the Ayyubid sultan as-Salih Ayyub overthrew the Ayyubid regime. It was based in Cairo and for much of its history, its territory spanned Egypt, Syria and parts of Anatolia, Upper Mesopotamia and the Hejaz. The sultanate was conquered by the Ottoman Empire in 1517.

== List of sultans ==
The Mamluk period is generally divided into two periods, Bahri and Burji. The Bahri sultans were predominantly of Turkic origins, while the Burji sultans were predominantly Circassians. The first sultan to come from the Bahriyya's ranks was Baybars. Thus, while the sultans before him are generally considered in the Bahri dynasty, they were not from Bahriyya regiment and actually opposed their political interests. Shajar al-Durr was not a mamluk at all, but is generally included in the lists due to the nature of her ascent and her status as a concubine. The Burji mamluks took the throne in 1382 with the accession of Barquq. Al-Musta'in Billah was also the Abbasid caliph and was installed by the mamluk emirs as a neutral figurehead ruler.

No.	Coin	Name (Note: Mamluks continued the Ayyubid tradition of regnal names combining temporal and religious themes: al-Malik ("King") plus an attribute for the temporal element, and an attribute plus al-Din for the religious element, followed by the personal name. For example, al-Malik al-Zahir Rukn al-Din Baybars ("The Triumphant King, Pillar of the Faith, Baybars"). In historiography, they are generally referred to by the temporal attribute and personal name, in this case al-Zahir Baybars.)	Reign	Ethnicity	Notes
-		Shajar al-Durr الملكة المستعصمية عصمة الدين شجر الدر al-Malika al-Musta’ṣimiyya ʿAṣmat ad-Dīn Shajar ad-Durr	2 May 1250 – 30 July 1250 (~3 months)	Turkic or Armenian	Concubine of as-Salih Ayyub; installed by Mamluks after Turanshah's assassination.; Abdicated after being unrecognized by caliph al-Musta'sim.
1		al-Mu'izz Aybak الملك المعز عز الدين أيبك al-Malik al-Muʿizz ʿIzz ad-Dīn Aybak	31 July 1250 – 4 August 1250 (~5 days)	Turkmen	Mamluk of as-Salih Ayyub; married Shajar ad-Durr, who abdicated to him.; Installed al-Ashraf Musa as nominal sultan while he held actual power.
Interregnum by al-Ashraf Musa (August 1250 – 1254)
(1)		al-Mu'izz Aybak الملك المعز عز الدين أيبك al-Malik al-Muʿizz ʿIzz ad-Dīn Aybak	1254 – 10 April 1257 (~3 years)	Turkmen	Deposed al-Ashraf Musa to assume the throne.; Killed on the orders of Shajar al-Durr.
2		al-Mansur Ali الملك المنصور نور الدين علي al-Malik al-Manṣūr Nūr ad-Dīn ʿAlī	15 April 1257 – November 1259 (~3 years)	Turkmen	Son of Aybak; installed by Mamluks as a puppet.; Deposed by Qutuz amidst threat of a Mongol invasion.
3		al-Muzaffar Qutuz الملك المظفر سيف الدين قطز al-Malik al-Muẓaffar Sayf ad-Dīn Quṭuz	November 1259 – 24 October 1260 (~11 months)	Khwarazmian	Mamluk of Aybak; vice-sultan for Ali, whom he deposed.; Defeated Mongols at Battle of Ain Jalut.; Assassinated by Bahri Mamluks.
Bahri Mamluks
4		az-Zahir Baybars الملك الظاهر ركن الدين بيبرس al-Malik aẓ-Ẓāhir Rukn ad-Dīn Baybars	24 October 1260 – 1 July 1277 (~17 years)	Kipchak Turk	Bahri Mamluk of as-Salih Ayyub; succeeded and possibly killed Qutuz.; Reinstated Abbasid caliphate in Cairo, installing al-Mustansir II, then al-Hakim I.; Conquered Principality of Antioch (1268).
5		as-Sa'id Barakah الملك السعيد ناصر الدين بركة al-Malik as-Saʿīd Nāṣir ad-Dīn Barakah	3 July 1277 – August 1279 (~2 years)	Kipchak Turk	Son and heir of Baybars.; Deposed and exiled by mamluks.
6		al-Adil Salamish الملك العادل بدر الدين سلاميش al-Malik al-ʿĀdil Badr ad-Dīn Salāmīsh	August 1279 – November 1279 (~3 months)	Kipchak Turk	Son of Baybars; installed by Mamluks.; Real power held by Qalawun, who eventually deposed and exiled him.
7		al-Mansur Qalawun الملك المنصور سيف الدين قلاوون al-Malik al-Manṣūr Sayf ad-Dīn Qalāwūn	November 1279 – 10 November 1290 (~11 years)	Kipchak Turk	Bahri Mamluk of as-Salih Ayyub; father-in-law of Barakah; deposed Salamish.; Conquest of County of Tripoli (1289).; Began purchasing Circassian mamluks; origin of the Burji crops.
8		al-Ashraf Khalil الملك الأشرف صلاح الدين خليل al-Malik al-Ashraf Ṣalāḥ ad-Dīn Khalīl	12 November 1290 – 12 December 1293 (~3 years)	Kipchak Turk	Son and heir of Qalawun.; Fall of Acre (1291); end of Crusader states.; Assassinated by disgruntled Mamluks.
9		an-Nasir Muhammad الملك الناصر ناصر الدين محمد al-Malik an-Nāṣir Nāṣir ad-Dīn Muḥammad	14 December 1293 – December 1294 (~1 year)	Kipchak Turk	Son of Qalawun; installed by Mamluks as a child puppet.; Deposed and exiled by Kitbugha.
10		al-Adil Kitbugha الملك العادل زين الدين كتبغا al-Malik al-ʿĀdil Zayn ad-Dīn Kitbughā	December 1294 – 7 December 1296 (~2 years)	Mongol	Mamluk of Qalawun; regent of young al-Nasir Muhammad.; Overthrown by and submitted to Lajin.
11		al-Mansur Lajin الملك المنصور حسام الدين لاجين al-Malik al-Manṣūr Ḥusām ad-Dīn Lājīn	7 December 1296 – 16 January 1299 (~2 years)	Possibly Circassian	Mamluk of Qalawun; vice-sultan to Kitbugha, whom he overthrew.; Killed by rebel mamluks.
(9)		an-Nasir Muhammad الملك الناصر ناصر الدين محمد al-Malik an-Nāṣir Nāṣir ad-Dīn Muḥammad	16 January 1299 – March 1309 (~10 years)	Kipchak Turk	Installed and dominated by mamluks.; Retreated to Levant to free himself from mamluks who dominated him.
12		al-Muzaffar Baybars II الملك المظفر ركن الدين بيبرس الجاشنكير al-Malik al-Muẓaffar Rukn ad-Dīn Baybars al-Jāshnakīr	April 1309 – 5 March 1310 (~11 months)	Circassian	Mamluk of Qalawun; dominated al-Nasir Muhammad; ruled after his retreat.; Arrested and executed by al-Nasir Muhammad.
(9)		an-Nasir Muhammad الملك الناصر ناصر الدين محمد al-Malik an-Nāṣir Nāṣir ad-Dīn Muḥammad	5 March 1310 – 6 June 1341 (~31 years)	Kipchak Turk	Returned to Egypt, removed Baybars and assumed the throne.
13		al-Mansur Abu Bakr الملك المنصور سيف الدين أبو بكر al-Malik al-Manṣūr Sayf ad-Dīn Abū Bakr	8 June 1341 – August 1341 (~2 months)	Kipchak Turk	Son and heir of an-Nasir Muhammad; controlled, and eventually deposed and executed by emir Qawsun.
14		al-Ashraf Kujuk الملك الأشرف علاء الدين كجك al-Malik al-Ashraf ʿAlāʾ ad-Dīn Kujuk	August 1341 – 21 January 1342 (~5 months)	Kipchak Turk	Son of an-Nasir Muhammad; installed as child ruler by regent Qawsun.; Removed after Qawsun's overthrow; killed on al-Salih Isma'il's orders.
15		an-Nasir Ahmad الملك الناصر شهاب الدين أحمد al-Malik an-Nāṣir Shihāb ad-Dīn Aḥmad	21 January 1342 – 27 June 1342 (~5 months)	Kipchak Turk	Eldest son of an-Nasir Muhammad; installed after Qawsun's overthrow; ruled from al-Karak.; Deposed by Mamluk emirs; executed on al-Salih Isma'il's orders.
16		as-Salih Isma'il الملك الصالح عماد الدين إسماعيل al-Malik aṣ-Ṣāliḥ ʿImād ad-Dīn Ismāʿīl	27 June 1342 – 3 August 1345 (~3 years)	Kipchak Turk	Son of an-Nasir Muhammad; installed by Mamluk emirs.
17		al-Kamil Sha'ban الملك الكامل سيف الدين شعبان al-Malik al-Kāmil Sayf ad-Dīn Shaʿbān	3 August 1345 – 18 September 1346 (~1 year)	Kipchak Turk	Son of an-Nasir Muhammad; brother and heir of al-Salih Isma'il.; Overthrown and executed by mamluks.
18		al-Muzaffar Hajji الملك المظفر سيف الدين حاجي al-Malik al-Muẓaffar Sayf ad-Dīn Ḥājjī	18 September 1346 – 10 December 1347 (~1 year)	Kipchak Turk	Son of an-Nasir Muhammad; installed and later killed by mamluks.
19		an-Nasir Hasan الملك الناصر بدر الدين حسن al-Malik an-Nāṣir Badr ad-Dīn Ḥasan	December 1347 – 21 August 1351 (~4 years)	Kipchak Turk	Son of an-Nasir Muhammad; installed by Mamluks as a child puppet.; Black Death in Egypt (1348).; Deposed and put under house arrest after attempting to assert his authority.
20		as-Salih Salih الملك الصالح صلاح الدين صالح al-Malik aṣ-Ṣāliḥ Ṣalāḥ ad-Dīn Ṣāliḥ	21 August 1351 – 20 October 1354 (~3 years)	Kipchak Turk	Son of an-Nasir Muhammad; installed and eventually deposed by mamluks.
(19)		an-Nasir Hasan الملك الناصر بدر الدين حسن al-Malik an-Nāṣir Badr ad-Dīn Ḥasan	20 October 1354 – 16 March 1361 (~6 years)	Kipchak Turk	Reinstalled by Mamluk emirs; killed by emir Yalbugha al-Umari.
21		al-Mansur Muhammad الملك المنصور صلاح الدين محمد al-Malik al-Manṣūr Ṣalāḥ ad-Dīn Muḥammad	17 March 1361 – 29 May 1363 (~2 years)	Kipchak Turk	Son of Hajji; controlled by Yalbugha al-Umari, who eventually deposed him.
22		al-Ashraf Sha'ban II الملك الأشرف زين الدين شعبان al-Malik al-Ashraf Zayn ad-Dīn Shaʿbān	29 May 1363 – 15 March 1377 (~14 years)	Kipchak Turk	Cousin of al-Mansur Muhammad; installed by Yalbugha al-Umari.; Conquest of Armenian Cilicia (1375).; Killed by emir Aynabak al-Yalbughawi.
23		al-Mansur Ali II الملك المنصور علاء الدين علي al-Malik al-Manṣūr ʿAlāʾ ad-Dīn ʿAlī	15 March 1377 – 19 May 1381 (~4 years)	Kipchak Turk	Son of al-Ashraf Sha'ban; child puppet under Barquq's regency.
24		as-Salih Hajji II الملك الصالح صلاح الدين حاجي al-Malik aṣ-Ṣāliḥ Ṣalāḥ ad-Dīn Ḥājjī	19 May 1381 – 26 November 1382 (~2 years)	Kipchak Turk	Son of al-Ashraf Sha'ban; child puppet under Barquq's regency, who eventually usurped him.
Burji Mamluks
25		az-Zahir Barquq الملك الظاهر سيف الدين برقوق al-Malik aẓ-Ẓāhir Sayf ad-Dīn Barqūq	26 November 1382 – 1 June 1389 (~7 years)	Circassian	Mamluk of Yalbugha; regent for al-Mansur Ali, then al-Salih Hajji.; First Burji Sultan; overthrown and imprisoned by revolting mamluks.
Bahri Mamluks
(24)		as-Salih Hajji II الملك الصالح صلاح الدين حاجي al-Malik aṣ-Ṣāliḥ Ṣalāḥ ad-Dīn Ḥājjī	1 June 1389 – January 1390 (~7 months)	Kipchak Turk	Restored by revolting mamluks.
Burji Mamluks
(25)		az-Zahir Barquq الملك الظاهر سيف الدين برقوق al-Malik aẓ-Ẓāhir Sayf ad-Dīn Barqūq	21 January 1390 – 20 June 1399 (~9 years)	Circassian	Restored after his supporters overcame rebels.
26		an-Nasir Faraj الملك الناصر ناصر الدين فرج al-Malik an-Nāṣir Nāṣir ad-Dīn Faraj	20 June 1399 – 20 September 1405 (~6 years)	Circassian	Son of Barquq.; Fled after plots of his overthrow by rebels surfaced.
27		al-Mansur Abd al-Aziz الملك المنصور عز الدين عبد العزيز al-Malik al-Manṣūr ʿIzz ad-Dīn ʿAbd al-ʿAzīz	20 September 1405 – November 1405 (~2 months)	Circassian	Son of Barquq.; Installed after Faraj fled; removed after his return.
(26)		an-Nasir Faraj الملك الناصر ناصر الدين فرج al-Malik an-Nāṣir Nāṣir ad-Dīn Faraj	November 1405 – 23 May 1412 (~7 years)	Circassian	Won the throne by defeating rebels.; Defeated and killed by rebel mamluks.
Abbasid Dynasty
28		al-Musta'in Billah الملك العادل المستعين بالله al-Malik al-ʿĀdil al-Mustaʿīn Billāh	23 May 1412 – 6 November 1412 (~6 months)	Arab	Abbasid caliph in Cairo; installed by rebel mamluks after Faraj's overthrow.; Dominated by emir Shaykh al-Mahmudi, who forced him to abdicate.
Burji Mamluks
29		al-Mu'ayyad Shaykh الملك المؤيد سيف الدين الشيخ المحمودي al-Malik al-Muʾayyad Sayf ad-Dīn Shaykh al-Maḥmūdī	6 November 1412 – 13 January 1421 (~8 years)	Circassian	Mamluk of Barquq; overthrew Faraj and took power after al-Musta'in's abdication.
30		al-Muzaffar Ahmad الملك المظفر أحمد al-Malik al-Muẓaffar Aḥmad	13 January 1421 – 29 August 1421 (~7 months)	Circassian	Son of Shaykh; ascended as an infant.; Dethroned and imprisoned by Tatar.
31		az-Zahir Tatar الملك الظاهر سيف الدين ططر al-Malik aẓ-Ẓāhir Sayf ad-Dīn Ṭaṭar	29 August 1421 – 30 November 1421 (~3 months)	Circassian	Mamluk of Barquq; regent of al-Muzaffar Ahmad.; Died of a chronic illness.
32		as-Salih Muhammad الملك الصالح الناصر الدين محمد al-Malik aṣ-Ṣāliḥ an-Nāṣir ad-Dīn Muḥammad	30 November 1421 – 1 April 1422 (~4 months)	Circassian	Son of Tatar; installed as a child.; Deposed after Barsbay's consolidation of power.
33		al-Ashraf Barsbay الملك الأشرف سيف الدين برسباي al-Malik al-Ashraf Sayf ad-Dīn Barsbāy	1 April 1422 – 7 June 1438 (~16 years)	Circassian	Mamluk of Barquq; overcame rivals and toppled al-Salih Muhammad.; Mamluk conquest of Cyprus (1426).
34		al-Aziz Yusuf الملك العزيز جمال الدين يوسف al-Malik al-ʿAzīz Jamāl ad-Dīn Yūsuf	7 June 1438 – 9 September 1438 (~3 months)	Circassian	Son of Barsbay; removed and put under house arrest by Jaqmaq.
35		az-Zahir Jaqmaq الملك الظاهر سيف الدين جقمق al-Malik aẓ-Ẓāhir Sayf ad-Dīn Jaqmaq	9 September 1438 – 1 February 1453 (~14 years)	Circassian	Mamluk of Barquq; regent of Yusuf, whom he usurped.
36		al-Mansur Uthman الملك المنصور فخر الدين عثمان al-Malik al-Manṣūr Fakhr ad-Dīn ʿUthmān	1 February 1453 – 15 March 1453 (~1 month)	Circassian	Son of Jaqmaq; deposed and exiled in a revolt by Inal.
37		al-Ashraf Inal الملك الأشرف سيف الدين إينال al-Malik al-Ashraf Sayf ad-Dīn Īnāl	15 March 1453 – 26 February 1461 (~8 years)	Circassian	Mamluk of Barquq.; Abdicated during an illness; died soon after.
38		al-Mu'ayyad Ahmad الملك المؤيد شهاب الدين أحمد al-Malik al-Muʾayyad Shihāb ad-Dīn Aḥmad	26 February 1461 – 28 June 1461 (~4 months)	Circassian	Son of Inal; ascended after his father abdicated in his favor.; Forced to abdicate by mamluks.
39		az-Zahir Khushqadam الملك الظاهر سيف الدين خشقدم al-Malik aẓ-Ẓāhir Sayf ad-Dīn Khushqadam	28 June 1461 – 9 October 1467 (~6 years)	Greek or Turkish	Mamluk of Shaykh; seized power amidst the turmoil after Ahmad's abdication.
40		az-Zahir Bilbay الملك الظاهر سيف الدين بلباي al-Malik aẓ-Ẓāhir Sayf ad-Dīn Bilbāy	9 October 1467 – 4 December 1467 (~2 months)	Circassian	Mamluk of Shaykh; crowned after Khushqadam's death.; Deposed and imprisoned by Jaqmaq's mamluks; died of plague.
41		az-Zahir Timurbugha الملك الظاهر تمربغا al-Malik aẓ-Ẓāhir Timurbughā	4 December 1467 – 31 January 1468 (~2 months)	Greek	Mamluk of Jaqmaq; ascended after Bilbay's removal.; Dethroned and imprisoned in a coup; freed by Qaitbay, retired to Damietta.
42		al-Ashraf Qaitbay الملك الأشرف سيف الدين قايتباي al-Malik al-Ashraf Sayf ad-Dīn Qāʾitbāy	31 January 1468 – 7 August 1496 (~29 years)	Circassian	Mamluk of Barsbay; ascended after defeating rival factions.; First Ottoman-Mamluk War (1485-1491).; Died of natural causes.
43		an-Nasir Muhammad II الملك الناصر محمد al-Malik an-Nāṣir Muḥammad	7 August 1496 – 31 October 1498 (~2 years)	Circassian	Son of Qaitbay; ascended after his death.; Overthrown and killed by rebel mamluks.
44		az-Zahir Qansuh الملك الظاهر قانصوه al-Malik aẓ-Ẓāhir Qānṣūh	31 October 1498 – 30 June 1500 (~2 years)	Circassian	Mamluk of Qaitbay; elected by rebel mamluks after al-Nasir Muhammad's overthrow.; Removed and exiled by disgruntled mamluks; killed by Tumanbay I.
45		al-Ashraf Janbalat الملك الأشرف جانبلاط al-Malik al-Ashraf Jānbalāṭ	30 June 1500 – 25 January 1501 (~7 months)	Circassian	Mamluk of Qaitbay; Installed after Qansuh's removal; overthrown and killed by Tumanbay I.
46		al-Adil Tumanbay الملك العادل طومان باي al-Malik al-ʿĀdil Ṭūmān Bāy	25 January 1501 – 20 April 1501 (~3 months)	Circassian	Mamluk of Qaitbay; governor of Syria; elected and overthrown by mamluks.
47		al-Ashraf Qansuh II الملك الأشرف قانصوه الغوري al-Malik al-Ashraf Qānṣūh al-Ghawrī	20 April 1501 – 24 August 1516 (~15 years)	Circassian	Mamluk of Qaitbay; installed by mamluks who overthrew Tumanbay I.; Wars against Portuguese and Safavids.; Second Ottoman-Mamluk war (1516).; Defeated and killed against Selim I.
48		al-Ashraf Tumanbay II الملك الأشرف طومان باي al-Malik al-Ashraf Ṭūmān Bāy	17 October 1516 – 15 April 1517 (~6 months)	Circassian	Mamluk of Qansuh II; regent of Egypt; crowned after his death.; Ottoman capture of Cairo; end of Mamluk sultanate.; Defeated and executed by Selim I.

== Genealogy ==
Relations between Mamluk Sultans. Solid lines indicate biological relation, dotted lines indicate marriage, and dashed lines indicate a master-mamluk relationship. Unless an year of death is given, the rulers ruled till death or died soon after their reign ended.
Bahri Sultans
Burji Sultans

Shajar al-Durr r. 1250, d. 1257	as-Salih Ayyub (Ayyubid Sultan) r. 1240–1249
al-Mu'izz Aybak r. 1250, 1254-1257	az-Zahir Baybars r. 1260–1277	al-Mansur Qalawun r. 1279–1290
al-Mansur Ali r. 1257–1259, d. 1266	al-Muzaffar Qutuz r. 1259–1260	as-Sa'id Barakah r. 1277–1279, d. 1280	al-Adil Salamish r. 1279, d. 1291	al-Ashraf Khalil r. 1290–1293	an-Nasir Muhammad r. 1293–1294, 1299-1309, 1310-1341	al-Adil Kitbugha r. 1294–1296, d. 1303	al-Mansur Lajin r. 1296–1299	al-Muzaffar Baybars II r. 1309–1310
al-Mansur Abu Bakr r. 1341	al-Ashraf Kujuk r. 1341–1342, d. 1345	an-Nasir Ahmad r. 1342, d. 1344	as-Salih Isma'il r. 1342–1345	al-Kamil Sha'ban r. 1345–1346	al-Muzaffar Hajji r. 1346–1347	an-Nasir Hasan r. 1347–1351, 1354-1361	as-Salih Salih r. 1351–1354, d. 1360	al-Amjad Hussain
Yalbugha al-Umari d. 1366	al-Mansur Muhammad r. 1361–1363, d. 1398	al-Ashraf Sha'ban II r. 1363–1377
az-Zahir Barquq r. 1382–1389, 1390-1399	al-Musta'in Billah r. 1412, d. 1430	al-Mansur Ali II r. 1377–1381	as-Salih Hajji II r. 1381–1382, 1389-1390, d. 1412
an-Nasir Faraj r. 1399–1405, 1405-1412	al-Mansur Abd al-Aziz r. 1405, d. 1406	al-Mu'ayyad Shaykh r. 1412–1421	az-Zahir Tatar r. 1421	al-Ashraf Barsbay r. 1422–1438	az-Zahir Jaqmaq r. 1438–1453	al-Ashraf Inal r. 1453–1461
az-Zahir Khushqadam r. 1461–1467	az-Zahir Bilbay r. 1467, d. 1468	al-Muzaffar Ahmad r. 1421, d. 1430	as-Salih Muhammad r. 1421–1422, d. 1430	al-Ashraf Qaitbay r. 1468–1496	al-Aziz Yusuf r. 1438	al-Mansur Uthman r. 1453, d. 1484	az-Zahir Timurbugha r. 1467–1468, d. 1475	al-Mu'ayyad Ahmad r. 1461, d. 1488
an-Nasir Muhammad II r. 1496–1498	az-Zahir Qansuh r. 1498–1500	al-Ashraf Janbalat r. 1500–1501	al-Adil Tumanbay r. 1501	al-Ashraf Qansuh II r. 1501–1516
al-Ashraf Tumanbay II r. 1516–1517

== Bibliography ==
- Bauden, Frédéric (2009). "The Sons of al-Nāṣir Muḥammad and the Politics of Puppets: Where Did It All Start?" (PDF). Mamluk Studies Review. 13 (1). Middle East Documentation Center, The University of Chicago.
- Drory, Joseph (2006). "The Prince who Favored the Desert: Fragmentary Biography of al-Nasir Ahmad (d. 745/1344)". In Wasserstein, David J.; Ayalon, Ami (eds.). Mamluks and Ottomans: Studies in Honour of Michael Winter. Routledge. ISBN 9781136579172.
- Garcin, Jean-Claude (1998). "The Regime of the Circassian Mamluks". In Petry, Carl F. (ed.). The Cambridge History of Egypt, Volume 1. Cambridge University Press. ISBN 9780521068857.
- Winter, Michael; Levanoni, Amalia, eds. (2004). The Mamluks in Egyptian and Syrian Politics and Society. Brill. ISBN 9789004132863.
- Northrup, Linda (1998). From Slave to Sultan: The Career of Al-Manṣūr Qalāwūn and the Consolidation of Mamluk Rule in Egypt and Syria (678-689 A.H./1279-1290 A.D.). Franz Steiner Verlag. ISBN 9783515068611.
- Northrup, Linda S. (1998). "The Bahri Mamluk sultanate". In Petry, Carl F. (ed.). The Cambridge History of Egypt, Vol. 1: Islamic Egypt 640-1517. Cambridge University Press. ISBN 9780521068857.
- Petry, Carl F. (1994). Protectors or Praetorians?: The Last Mamluk Sultans and Egypt's Waning as a Great Power. State University of New York Press. ISBN 9780791421406.
- Yosef, Koby (2012b). "Dawlat al-atrāk or dawlat al-mamālīk? Ethnic origin or slave origin as the defining characteristic of the ruling élite in the Mamlūk sultanate". Jerusalem Studies in Arabic and Islam. 39. Hebrew University of Jerusalem: 387–410.
