= Wafidiyya =

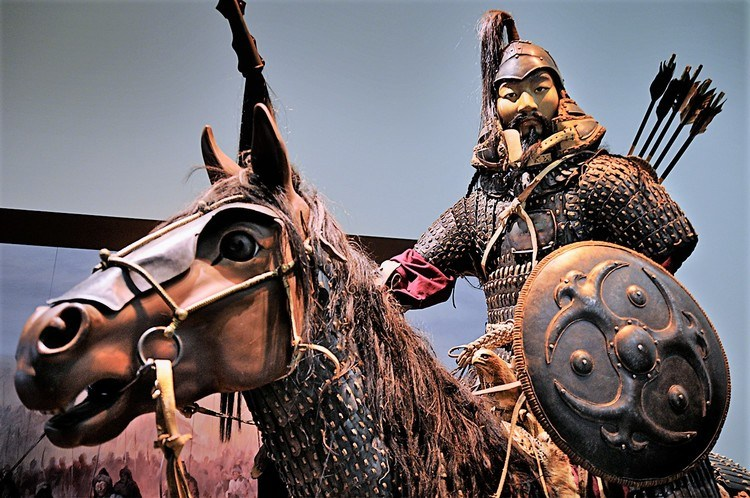
Recreation of a Mongol warrior on horseback located at The ArtScience Museum in Singapore.

The wāfidiyya were troops of various ethnic backgrounds who came into the military service of the Mamlūk Sultanate of Egypt and Syria in exchange for asylum. The term is a collective noun formed from the singular wāfid, meaning "one who comes, makes his way, in a delegation or group".

The wāfidiyya were predominantly Mongols, Kurds, Khwarazmians and other Turks. The Mamlūks, themselves mostly Turkish, regarded the Mongols as co-ethnics. Large numbers of Kurds and Khwarazmians fled the Mongol conquest of Khwarazmia and took refuge in Mamlūk Syria. This preceded the first major influx of Mongol wāfidiyya that took place in the aftermath of the first Mongol invasion of Syria in 1260, during the reign of Sultan Baybars (1260–77). The bulk of the wāfidiyya were settled in the devastated parts of Syria and Palestine, while only their leaders were allowed to settle in Egypt. Another large influx of 10–18,000 Mongol wāfidiyya from the Ilkhanate took place under Sultan al-ʿĀdil Kitbughā (1295–97), himself an Oirat Mongol.

Baybars was purportedly frightened by the sudden influx of soldiers seeking asylum and sought to disperse ethnic Mongols throughout the army. He did allow some to join the elite Baḥriyya regiment. He was said to have appointed wāfidiyya up to the rank of "emir of a hundred" (amīr miʾa), but only one Khwarazmian wāfid, related to Baybars by marriage, is known to have attained this rank. There were between 113 and 300 leaders among those who sought asylum from Kitbughā in 1296. Their supreme leader, Ṭurghāy, received the rank of "emir of forty" (amīr arbaʿīn), perhaps because he was a son-in-law of the Ilkhan Hülegü.

Kitbughā favoured the Oirat wāfidiyya and this led in part to his downfall. The Oirats remained politically important at the start of the reign of al-Nāṣir Muḥammad ibn Ḳalāwūn (1309–40), but by 1333 some had been reduced servants (atbāʿ) of the Mamlūks. This represented a complete inversion of their original statuses. The Sultan Kitbughā and the regent Sayf al-Din Salar, both Oirats, had entered Egypt as slaves and risen through the Mamlūk ranks to the highest positions, whereas the Oirat wāfidiyya had entered Egypt as free men and been reduced to servile status within a generation or two.

== Sources ==
- Amitai-Preiss, Reuven (1995). Mongols and Mamluks: The Mamluk-Ilkhanid War, 1260–1281. Cambridge University Press.
- Ayalon, David (1951). "The Wafidiya in the Mamluk Kingdom". Islamic Culture. 25: 89–104.
- Ayalon, David (2002). "Wāfidiyya". In Bearman, P. J.; Bianquis, Th.; Bosworth, C. E.; van Donzel, E. & Heinrichs, W. P. (eds.). The Encyclopaedia of Islam, Second Edition. Volume XI: W–Z. Leiden: E. J. Brill. pp. 26–27. ISBN 978-90-04-12756-2.
- Landa, Ishayahu (2016). "Oirats in the Ilkhanate and the Mamluk Sultanate in the Thirteenth to the Early Fifteenth Centuries: Two Cases of Assimilation into the Muslim Environment" (PDF). Mamlūk Studies Review. 19: 149–91.
- Nobutaka, Nakamachi (2006). "The Rank and Status of Military Refugees in the Mamluk Army: A Reconsideration of the Wāfidīyah" (PDF). Mamlūk Studies Review. 10: 55–81.
