= An-Nasir Faraj =

- al-Malik al-Nasir
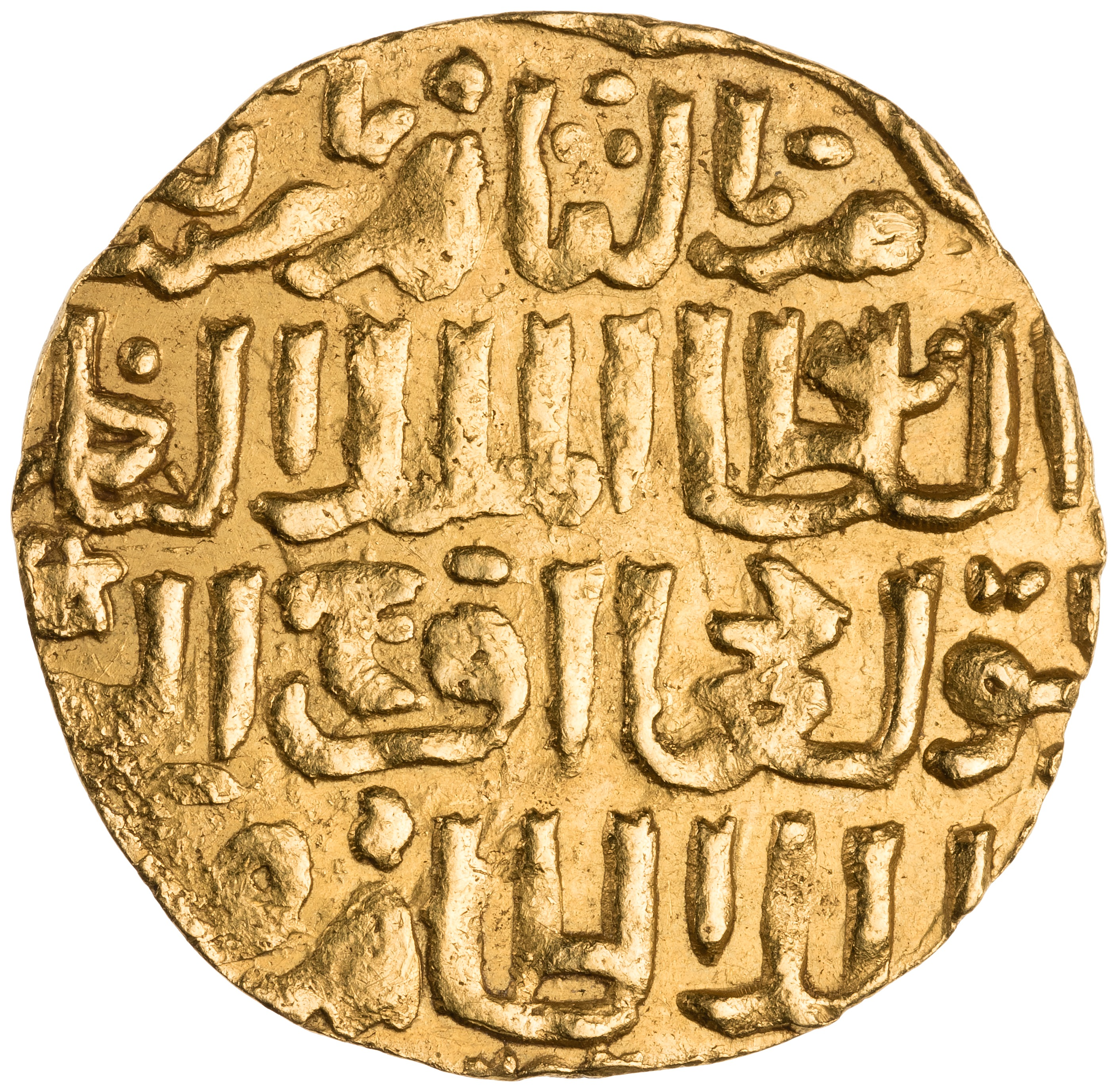
- Gold dinar of al-Nasir Faraj, minted in Cairo around 1405-06

Sultan of Egypt and Syria
- 1st reign: 20 June 1399 – 20 September 1405
- Predecessor: al-Zahir Barquq
- Successor: al-Mansur Abd al-Aziz
- 2nd reign: 28 November 1405 – 23 May 1412
- Predecessor: al-Mansur Abd al-Aziz
- Successor: al-Musta'in billah
- Born: c. 1386
- Died: 23 May 1412 (aged 25–26); Damascus
- Spouse: Khawand Fatima; Lâ Aflaha man Zalama; Thuraiya
- Issue: Ghars ad-Din Khalil; Khawand Asiya; Khawand Satita; Khawand Shakra
Names
- Al-Malik al-Nāṣir Nāṣir al-Dīn Faraj ibn Barqūq الملك الناصر ناصر الدين فرج بن برقوق
- Father: al-Zahir Barquq
- Mother: Khawand Shirin
- Religion: Sunni Islam

Al-Malik al-Nāṣir Nāṣir al-Dīn Faraj ibn Barqūq (Arabic: الملك الناصر ناصر الدين فرج بن برقوق; 1386 – 23 May 1412), commonly known as an-Nasir Faraj, was the second Circassian Burji sultan of the Mamluk Sultanate, reigning from 1399 to 1412 with a brief interruption in 1405.

== Biography ==
=== Background and accession ===
Faraj was the eldest son of the Mamluk sultan Barquq. He was born in 1386, a few years after his father had usurped the last Bahri sultan as-Salih Hajji. A day before his death on 20 June 1399, Barquq designated Faraj as his successor, followed by his brothers Abd al-Aziz and Ibrahim. The caliph al-Mutawakkil I, qadis, emirs and other officials pledged to guarantee the succession.

After Barquq's sudden death, Faraj, aged only 13, was invested as al-Malik al-Nasir by the caliph. Controlled by his father's emirs from the outset, Faraj spent several months asserting his independence. Many Syrian emirs harbored misgivings about Barquq's succession by his underage son, and Cairene emirs sent al-Mutawakkil I to reassure them and secure their allegiance.

=== First reign ===
Soon after his reign began, Timur launched his invasion of Syria. By October 1400, Timurid forces took Aleppo and Hama, and besieged Damascus. Faraj and his emirs mustered their forces and moved to defend the city. In January 1401, the Mamluk army was defeated outside Damascus, and Faraj retreated to Cairo. The young sultan dispatched an embassy, including Ibn Khaldun, to negotiate with the Turco-Mongol conqueror, though the city was sacked after the embassy's withdrawal.

In September of the same year, a number of leading Cairene emirs, frustrated by Faraj's unsatisfactory rule, rebelled against the sultan and began fighting with each other for supremacy as well. After failed attempts at reconciliation through negotiations by al-Mutawakkil I and appeasements, Faraj fought and defeated the rebel forces at Qarafa. Several of the emirs were captured, while others, including Nawruz al-Hafizi, fled.

=== Deposition, return and second reign ===
The hostile emirs, including Nawruz, eventually managed to break away from Cairo's authority in Syria, removing the sultan's name from the Friday sermon and defeating his troops in June 1405. With advice from the emir Saad al-Din bin Ghurab, Faraj went into hiding as the rebels occupied the citadel on 20 September 1405 and installed Barquq's younger son al-Mansur Abd al-Aziz as a figurehead. Two months later, Faraj came out of hiding and retook Cairo with newly assembled forces of Ibn Ghurab. Abd al-Aziz was deposed and Ibn Ghurab was given significant authority for his role in restoring Faraj to his throne. A month later, on 22 January 1406, Faraj invested the late al-Mutawakkil's son and successor al-Abbas as caliph al-Mustain Billah.

Faraj continued to consolidate his personal power against the powerful emirs, but he was largely successful only in Cairo. Syria, where he had sent many of the disgruntled rebels from his Cairo conflicts, became a center of rebellion. Emirs Nawruz and Shaykh al-Mahmudi continued attempting to establish independent authority in Syria, leading Faraj to lead expeditions against them in 1409 and 1410. The continued civil war, along with plague and famine, reduced the population of the sultanate to one-third.

=== Downfall and death ===
In March 1412, Faraj was defeated at Baalbek and fled to the citadel of Damascus after many of his troops defected to Shaykh and Nawruz. The emirs, each seeking to seize the sultanate for themselves, eventually placed the caliph al-Musta'in as a neutral candidate, who refused at first but gave in after a campaign of persuasion by both Nawruz and Shaykh.

The caliph's accession as sultan caused many of Faraj's supporters in Damascus to abandon him and pledge allegiance to the Commander of the Faithful. After hearing of Aq Qoyunlu reinforcements marching to support the former sultan, Shaykh's forces rushed and defeated Faraj in battle for the final time. Faraj retreated to the citadel, and surrendered after a brief siege. Shaykh, who in the past had been shown clemency by the former sultan, favored exile as a punishment for him. However, Nawruz, whose forces had borne the brunt of battles against him, and al-Musta'in, who perceived Faraj as a threat to his reign, wanted him executed. Eventually, Faraj was sentenced to death, and he was stabbed to death in prison on 23 May 1412. He was buried in Bab al-Faradis cemetery in Damascus.

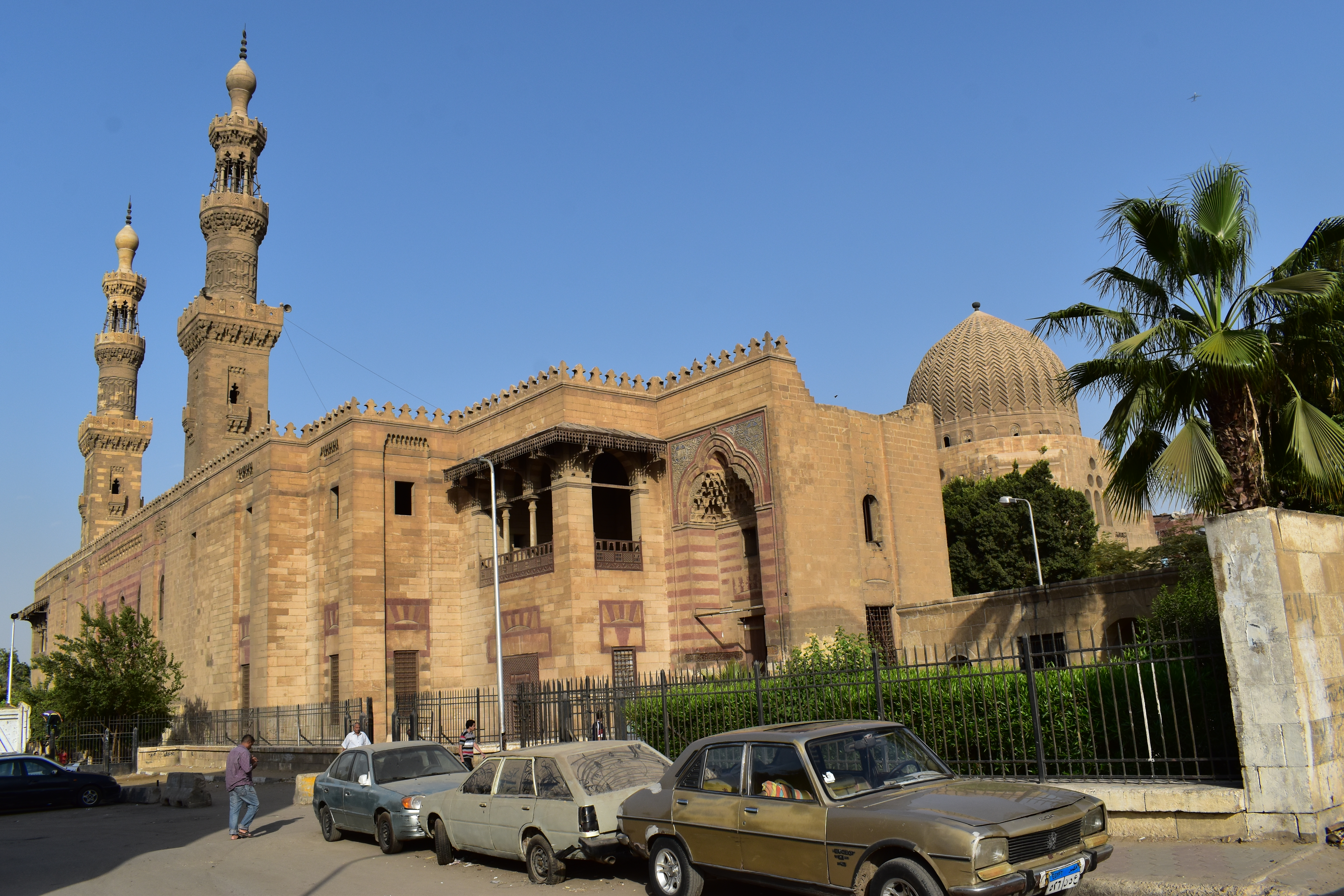
Khanqah of Faraj ibn Barquq in Cairo, completed by Faraj in 1411 on the burial site of his father, Barquq.

== Family ==
One of his wives was Khawand Fatima, the sister of the historian Ibn Taghribirdi. After Faraj's death, she married Inal Nauruzi. One of his concubines was Lâ Aflaha man Zalama. She gave birth to Faraj's son, Ghars ad-Din Khalil. Another concubine was Thuraiya. She gave birth to Faraj's daughter, Khawand Asiya. Another daughter of Faraj named Khawand Satita married Sidi Ibrahim, son of Sultan Al-Mu'ayyad Shaykh. She died in 1416. Another daughter, Khawand Shakra, married Amir Jarbash al-Muhammadi and had a son, Nasir ad-Din Muhammad. She died in 1482.

== See also ==
- Siege of Damascus (1400)
- Khanqah of Faraj ibn Barquq

== Bibliography ==
- Banister, Mustafa (2021). The Abbasid Caliphate of Cairo, 1261–1517: Out of the Shadows. Edinburgh Studies in Classical Islamic History and Culture. Edinburgh: Edinburgh University Press. ISBN 978-1-4744-5336-3.
- D'hulster, Kristof; Steenbergen, Jo Van (2014). "Family Matters: The Family-In-Law Impulse in Mamluk Marriage Policy". Annales Islamologiques. 47: 61–82.
- Ghersetti, A. (2016). Al-Suyūṭī, a Polymath of the Mamlūk Period: Proceedings of the themed day of the First Conference of the School of Mamlūk Studies (Ca' Foscari University, Venice, June 23, 2014). Islamic History and Civilization. Brill. ISBN 978-90-04-33452-6.
- Leslau, W. (1958). The Verb in Harari: (South Ethiopic). University of California Press.
- Massoud, S. (2007). The Chronicles and Annalistic Sources of the Early Mamluk Circassian Period. Islamic History and Civilization. Brill. ISBN 978-90-474-1979-2.
- Muir, William (1896). The Mameluke; or, Slave dynasty of Egypt, 1260-1517, A. D. Smith, Elder.
- Onimus, Clément (2019). Les maîtres du jeu : Pouvoir et violence politique à l'aube du sultanat mamlouk circassien (784-815/1382-1412) (in French). Éditions de la Sorbonne. ISBN 9791035105440.
- Taghrībirdī, A.M.Y.I.; Popper, W. (1960). History of Egypt, 1382-1469 A.D. University of California Press.
- University of California, Berkeley (1960). University of California Publications in Semitic Philology. History of Egypt, 1382-1469 A.D. University of California Press.

Regnal titles
Preceded by Sayf-ad-Din Barquq	Mamluk Sultan of Egypt; 1399–1405	Succeeded by Izz ad-Din Abd al-Aziz
Preceded by Izz ad-Din Abd al-Aziz	Mamluk Sultan of Egypt; 1405–1412	Succeeded by Al-Musta'in Billah
