= Al-Ashraf Sha'ban =

Sultan of Mamluk Egypt

- Al-Malik al-Ashraf
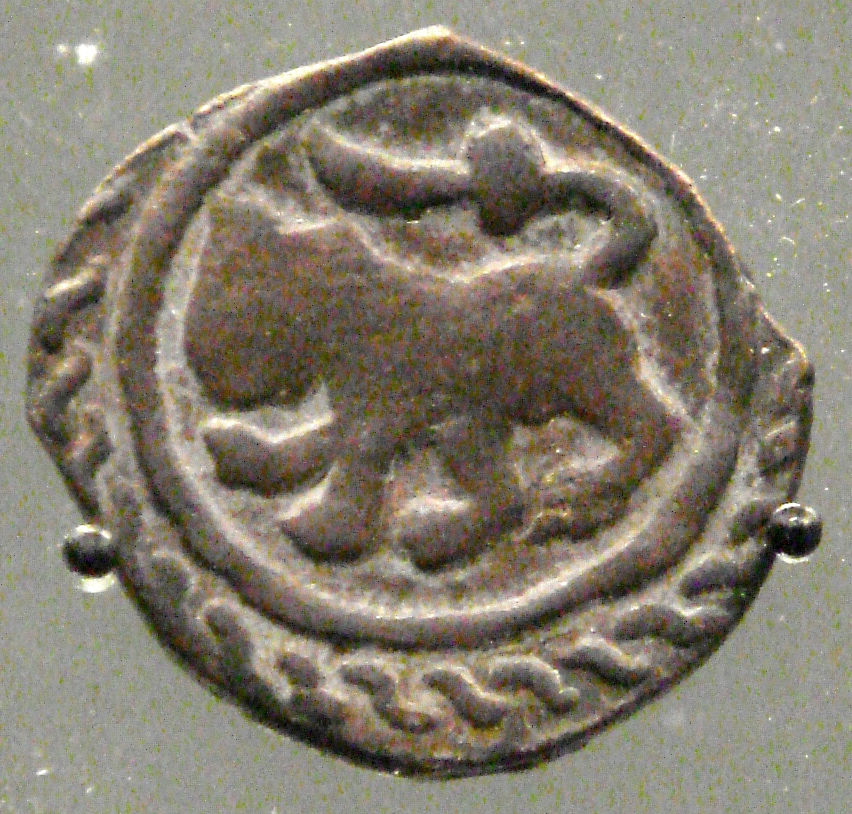
- Sha'ban II copper fals coin from Hama. British Museum.

Sultan of Egypt
- Reign: 29 May 1363 – 15 March 1377
- Predecessor: Al-Mansur Muhammad
- Successor: Ala ad-Din Ali
- Born: 1353/54; Cairo Citadel, Egypt
- Died: 15 March 1377 (aged 23–24)
- Burial: Cairo
- Issue: Al-Mansur Ali; Abu Bakr; Ahmad; Ramadan; Qasim; Muhammad; Isma'il; As-Salih Hajji
Names
- Al-Malik al-Ashraf Zayn ad-Din Abu al-Ma'ali Sha'ban ibn Husayn ibn Muhammad ibn Qalawun
- House: Qalawuni
- Dynasty: Bahri
- Father: Al-Amjad Husayn
- Religion: Sunni Islam

Al-Ashraf Zayn ad-Din Abu al-Ma'ali Sha'ban ibn Husayn ibn Muhammad ibn Qalawun (Arabic: الأشرف زين الدين شعبان, lit. 'The Most Noble, Grace of the Faith, Father of Excellence, Sha'ban son of Husayn, son of Muhammad, son of Qalawun', better known as al-Ashraf Sha'ban (السلطان شعبان or Sha'ban II, was a Turk Mamluk sultan of the Bahri dynasty in 1363–1377. He was a grandson of Sultan al-Nasir Muhammad (r. 1310–1341). He had two sons (out of a total of eight) who succeeded him: al-Mansur Ali and as-Salih Hajji.

== Biography ==
=== Early life and family ===
Sha'ban was born in 1353/54. At Cairo Citadel. His father was al-Amjad Husayn (died 1363), a son of Sultan an-Nasir Muhammad (r. 1310–1341) who, unlike many of his brothers, never reigned as sultan. Sha'ban's mother was Khawand Baraka (d. 1372), a former jarya slave woman who married al-Amjad Husayn. Sha'ban had four brothers, Anuk (d. 1390/91), Ibrahim, Ahmad and Janibak (d. 1428), and three sisters, Zahra (d. 1370), Shaqra (d. 1401) and Sara (d. 1432).

=== Reign ===
In late May 1363, the Mamluk magnates, in effect the senior emirs, led by Emir Yalbugha al-Umari, deposed Sultan al-Mansur Muhammad on charges of illicit behavior and installed al-Ashraf Sha'ban, then ten years old, as his replacement. Yalbugha and the emirs viewed al-Ashraf Sha'ban as a figurehead who would be easy to manage. Yalbugha maneuvered to become the effective regent of the sultan. In December 1366, a number of senior emirs and Yalbugha's own mamluks launched a revolt against him. At the start of the revolt, a significant number of Yalbugha's mamluks remained loyal to their master, but once al-Ashraf Sha'ban, who sought to rule in his own right, lent his support to the rebels, they too joined the revolt.

After Yalbugha was captured and killed by his mamluks, al-Ashraf Sha'ban made a number of them emirs, but most were left without employment or a patron. At that point, al-Ashraf Sha'ban had only 200 of his own mamluks, the relatively low number being attributed to his lack of real power during Yalbugha's regency. By June 1367, Yalbugha's former mamluks had largely entered the services of Emir Asandamur an-Nasiri, who had neutralized his rival emirs.

In late 1367, Asandamur and his newly acquired mamluks moved against al-Ashraf Sha'ban, but were defeated. The revolt was also supported by Emir Khalil ibn Qawsun, the son of former regent Emir Qawsun (d. 1342) and a daughter of an-Nasir Muhammad who had been appointed atabeg al-asakir (commander in chief) by al-Ashraf Sha'ban earlier that year. Khalil had been promised the throne by Asandamur. According to a contemporary Mamluk chronicler, al-Nuwayri al-Iskandarani, al-Ashraf Sha'ban was significantly assisted by the "common people", who killed many of the mamluk rebels, "making them bite the dust". The support of the commoners was enlisted by al-Ashraf Sha'ban's loyalist commanders, emirs Asanbugha Ibn al-Abu Bakri and Qushtamur al-Mansuri, both of whom withdrew from the battle in Cairo and left the commoners to fight Asandamur's forces alone. The commoners were able to turn the tide in favor of al-Ashraf Sha'ban's partisans, and the latter's emirs and Royal Mamluks returned to the battle, defeated the rebels and arrested Asandamur. Because of their loyalty and key support during the revolt, al-Ashraf Sha'ban treated the commoners well throughout his reign.

Later, in 1373, survivors among Yalbugha's former mamluks, including the future sultan, Barquq, were allowed back to Cairo from exile to train al-Ashraf Sha'ban's mamluks. In June/July 1373, conflict broke out between al-Ashraf Sha'ban and Emir Uljay al-Yusufi. The commoners once again took up arms alongside al-Ashraf Sha'ban's loyalists. After some eleven confrontations, al-Ashraf Sha'ban, using Emir Aynabak al-Yalbughawi as an intermediary, persuaded Uljay's emirs and lower-ranking mamluks to defect. Uljay was killed that year. In 1374, a famine set in within Egypt that would last two years. To mitigate the burden on his subjects, al-Ashraf Sha'ban undertook efforts to provide food for the poor, dividing the financial responsibility of the effort among his emirs and the well-to-do merchants of Cairo.

In 1375, al-Ashraf Sha'ban conquered the city of Sis, the last stronghold of the Armenian Kingdom of Cilicia. This destroyed the Armenian kingdom and extended the boundaries of the Mamluk empire up to the Taurus Mountains in southern Anatolia.

In March 1376, al-Ashraf Sha'ban departed for the Hajj pilgrimage to Mecca. Once he left Egypt, Aynabak led a revolt of the Royal Mamluks and unemployed mamluks against the sultan. Meanwhile, the Mamluk guard that accompanied al-Ashraf Sha'ban also rebelled against him. Al-Ashraf Sha'ban attempted to flee, but he was later captured by the rebels at Aqaba. In return for a promised promotion from Aynabak, Emir Jarkas as-Sayfi strangled and killed al-Ashraf Sha'ban in 1377. The rebels installed one of al-Ashraf Sha'ban's sons, al-Mansur Ali, as his successor.

Sha'ban was buried in one of the mausoleums of the madrasa he had built for his mother in the Darb al-Ahmar area, having never completed his own mausoleum complex.

== See also ==
- Madrasa of Umm al-Sultan Sha'ban
- Demise of Cilician Armenia

== Bibliography ==
- Levanoni, Amalia (1995). A Turning Point in Mamluk History: The Third Reign of Al-Nāṣir Muḥammad Ibn Qalāwūn (1310-1341). Brill. ISBN 9789004101821.
- Levanoni, Amalia (2006). "Awlad al-nas in the Mamluk Army during the Bahri Period". In Wasserstein, David J.; Ayalon, Ami (eds.). Mamluks and Ottomans: Studies in Honour of Michael Winter. Routledge. ISBN 9781136579172.
- Ayalon, David (2005). "Studies on the Structure of the Mamluk Army". In Hawting, Gerald R. (ed.). Muslims, Mongols and Crusaders. Routledge.
- Haarmann, Ulrich (1998). "Joseph's Law–The Careers and Activities of Mamluk Descendants before the Ottoman Conquest of Egypt". In Philipp, Thomas; Haarmann, Ulrich (eds.). The Mamluks in Egyptian Politics and Society. Cambridge University Press. ISBN 9780521591157.
- Al-Harithy, Howayda (2005). "Female Patronage of Mamluk Architecture in Cairo". In Sonbol, Amira El Azhary (ed.). Beyond The Exotic: Women's Histories In Islamic Societies. Syracuse University Press. ISBN 9780815630555.
- Northrup, Linda S. (1998). "The Bahri Mamluk sultanate". In Petry, Carl F. (ed.). The Cambridge History of Egypt, Vol. 1: Islamic Egypt 640-1517. Cambridge University Press. ISBN 9780521068857.
- Rabbat, Nasser O. (1995). The Citadel of Cairo: A New Interpretation of Royal Mameluk Architecture. Brill. ISBN 9789004101241.
- Steenbergen, Jo Van (2011). "On the Brink of a New Era? Yalbughā al-Khāṣṣakī (d. 1366) and the Yalbughāwīyah" (PDF). Mamluk Studies Review. 15. Middle East Documentation Center, The University of Chicago: 117–152.
- Steenbergen, Jo Van (September 2011). "The Amir Yalbughā al-Khāṣṣakī, the Qalāwūnid Sultanate, and the Cultural Matrix of Mamlūk Society: A Reassessment of Mamlūk Politics in the 1360s". Journal of the American Oriental Society. 131 (3). American Oriental Society: 423–443. JSTOR 41380710.
- Caroline Williams, Richard Bordeaux Parker, Robin Sabin, Jaroslaw Dobrowolski, Ola Sei, Islamic Monuments in Cairo: The Practical Guide American Univ in Cairo Press, 2002 ISBN 977-424-695-0 ISBN 9789774246951

Regnal titles
Preceded by al-Mansur Muhammad	Mamluk Sultan; 1363–1377	Succeeded by al-Mansur Ali
