= Al-Mansur Ali II, Sultan of Egypt =

Egyptian Mamluk Sultan

Ala' ad-Din Ali
- Al-Malik al-Mansur
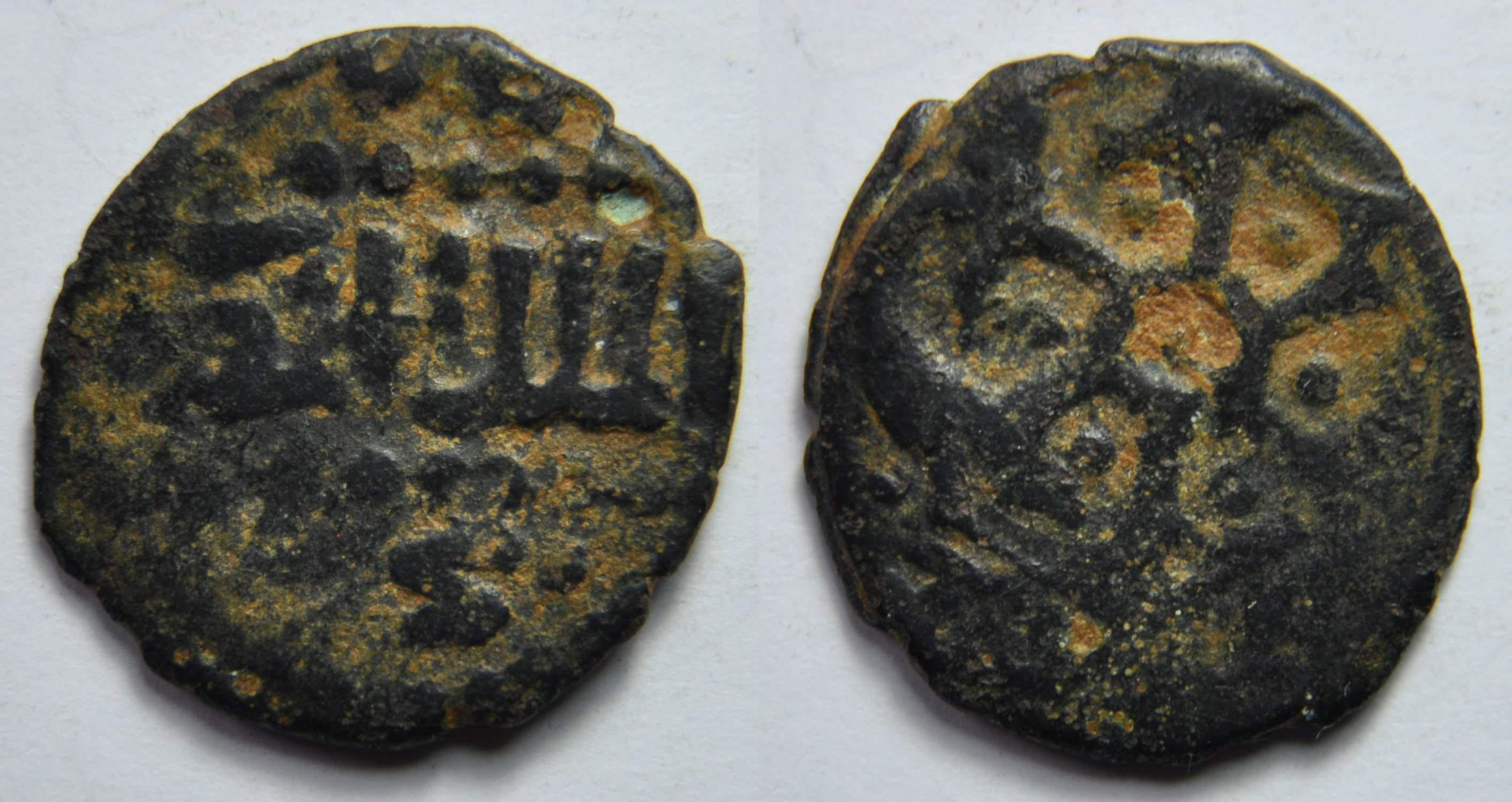
- fals, issued under Al-Mansur Ali II

Sultan of Egypt
- Reign: 15 March 1377 – May 1381
- Predecessor: Al-Ashraf Sha'ban
- Successor: As-Salih Hajji
- Born: 1368; Cairo, Mamluk Sultanate
- Died: 19 May 1381 (age 13)
- Issue: None
Names
- Al-Malik al-Mansur Ala' ad-Din Ali ibn Sha'ban ibn Husayn ibn Muhammad ibn Qalawun
- House: Qalawuni
- Dynasty: Bahri
- Father: Al-Ashraf Sha'ban
- Religion: Islam

Al-Mansur Ala' ad-Din Ali ibn Sha'ban ibn Husayn ibn Muhammad ibn Qalawun (1368 – 19 May 1381), better known as al-Mansur Ali II, was the Mamluk sultan reigning in 1377–1381. He was installed to the throne while a child by the senior Mamluk emirs after they had rebelled against and killed al-Mansur Ali's father, Sultan al-Ashraf Sha'ban (r. 1361–1377). Al-Mansur Ali was a figurehead, with real power being held by the senior emirs, most prominently Barquq. Al-Mansur Ali died about four years into his reign and was succeeded by his younger brother, as-Salih Hajji, although real power was still held by Barquq, who usurped the throne in 1382.

== Biography ==
Al-Mansur Ali was born in Cairo in 1368. His father was Sultan al-Ashraf Sha'ban (r. 1363–1377) and his mother was Khawand bint Manklibugha, the daughter of a Mamluk emir. Al-Mansur Ali had seven brothers and half-brothers and six sisters and half-sisters. His brothers were Abu Bakr (d. 1400), Ahmad (d. before 1381), Ramadan (d. before 1381), Qasim (d. before 1381), Isma'il (d. 1395) and Hajji (d. 1412). His sisters that were named in the Mamluk-era sources were Khadija (d. 1422/23) and Fatima (d. 1432).

Al-Ashraf Sha'ban was killed in a mamluk revolt in March 1377 and the rebel Mamluk emirs installed al-Mansur Ali, then a young child, as sultan. In the power struggle between the rebels, two relatively low-ranking emirs and mamluks of Emir Yalbugha al-Umari (d. 1366), Barquq and Baraka, became the regents of al-Mansur Ali. Barquq had taken part in the mamluk revolt against al-Ashraf Sha'ban, and was formally appointed to the powerful post of atabeg al-asakir (commander in chief) by al-Mansur Ali in 1378. Although sultans typically had access to the royal treasury, al-Mansur Ali's income was limited to a daily stipend. Al-Mansur Ali died on 19 May 1381, and were it not for the strong objections of the other senior emirs, Barquq would have assumed the sultanate and thereby bring an end to the Qalawunid dynasty that been in power since 1277. Instead, al-Mansur Ali was succeeded by his younger brother, as-Salih Hajji, then nine years old. Barquq remained the power behind the throne until he toppled as-Salih Hajji and usurped the sultanate in November 1382.

Regnal titles
Preceded by Al-Ashraf Sha'ban	Mamluk Sultan; 15 March 1377 – 19 May 1381	Succeeded by As-Salih Hajji
