= Lajin =

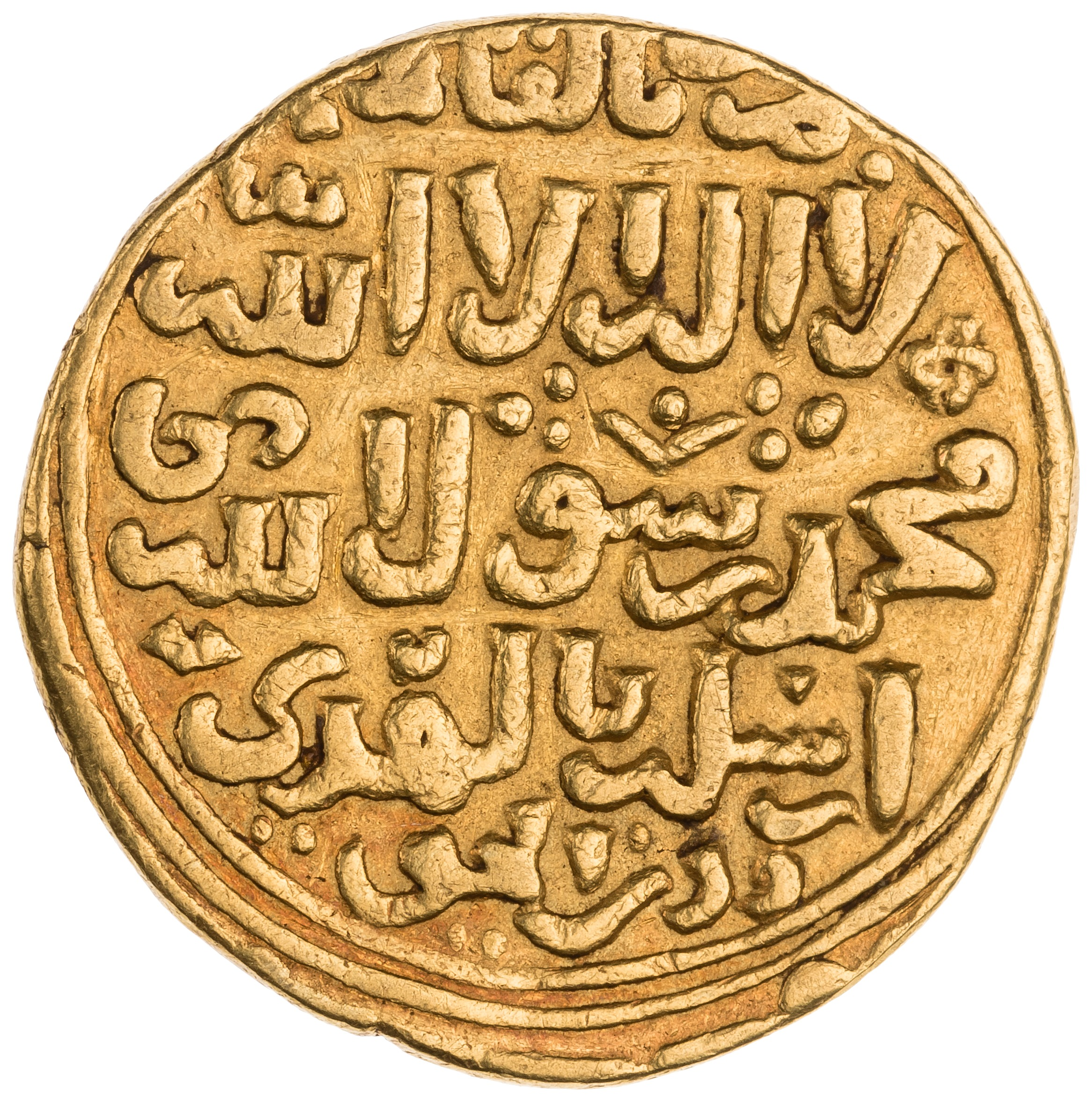
- Gold dinar of Lajin, minted in Cairo in 1297-99

Sultan of Egypt
- Reign: 7 December 1296 – 16 January 1299
- Predecessor: Al-Adil Kitbugha
- Successor: An-Nasir Muhammad
- Born: unknown
- Died: 16 January 1299; Cairo
- Religion: Sunni Islam

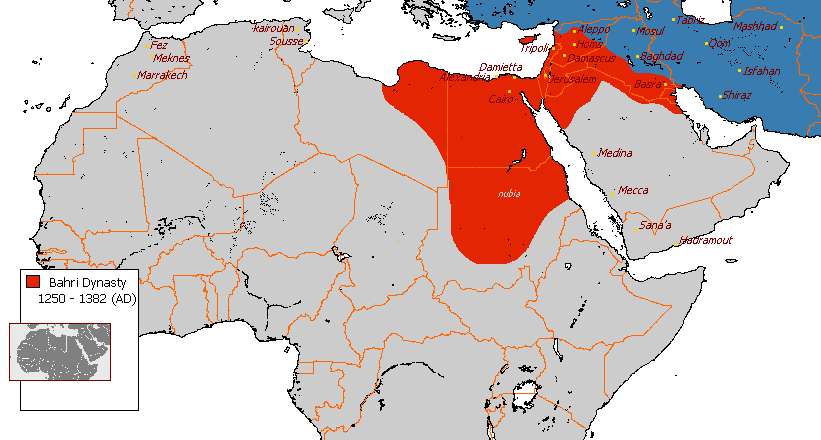
Dominion of Bahri Mamluks ( red )

Lajin (Arabic: لاجين), full royal name al-Malik al-Mansur Hussam al-Din Lajin al-Mansuri (الملك المنصور حسام الدين لاجين المنصوري; d. January 16, 1299, Cairo) was a Mamluk sultan of Egypt from 1296 to 1299. Most academic historians have suggested that Lajin was of Anatolian Greek origin, although some have speculated that he might even have been of Prussian or Circassian origin.

== Early career ==
Lajin was initially a mamluk of Al-Mansur Ali, then he was bought by Al-Mansur Qalawun, whom had him to marry his daughter. He was imprisoned by Sunqur al-Ashqar in Damascus, then he became the Mamluk na'ib of Damascus in 1280, when Sunqur was defeated. He was later sacked by Sultan Al-Ashraf Khalil and sentenced to death, but emir Badr ad-Din Bidra Al-Mansuri sought mercy for him.

In 1293, he participated in the assassination of Qalawun's son the Sultan Al-Ashraf Khalil. He later convinced Al-Adil Kitbugha to depose Al-Nasir Muhammad to become the new sultan. He then tried assassinating the Sultan Al-Adil Kitbugha but failed, Kitbugha, fearing for his life, sent to him afterwards that he was ready to remove himself from the Sultanate for him to be the Sultan instead, Lajin agreed and became Sultan under the title Al-Mansur Hussam ad-Din, while Kitbugha was given a fief in the Levant.

== Reign ==
In 1297, he allowed Baibars' wife and son Khadir along with Solamish's corpse to return to Cairo from their exile in Constantinople, based on demands from his wife, Baibars' daughter. Later on, he appointed his mamluk named Mankutumur as atabeg, which displeased emirs especially Bisri who was killed by a conspiracy from Mankutumur.

As the Ilkhanids were preoccupied with internal matters, Lajin sent an army led by Bader ad-Din Baktash, later joined by Sanjar al-Dawdardi, to raid the Armenian Kingdom of Cilicia.

However, Mankutumur had started to change emirs' positions which angered them, especially emir Saif al-Din Kirji, to the extent they had both Lajin and Mankutumur killed on 16 January 1299.

== Sources ==
- Clot, André (2009). L'Égypte des Mamelouks 1250-1517. L'empire des esclaves (in French). Paris: Perrin. ISBN 978-2-262-03045-2.
- Gibb, H. A. R. (1960). The Encyclopaedia of Islam. Brill Archive. ISBN 90-04-06761-2.

Lajin Bahri dynasty Cadet branch of the Mamluk Sultanate Born: ? Died: 16 January 1299
Regnal titles
| Preceded by Kitbugha | Sultan of Egypt and Syria; 7 December 1296 – 16 January 1299 | Succeeded by Al-Nasir Muhammad |
