= Izz al-Din Abd al-Aziz =

Sultan of Egypt and Syria
- Reign: 20 September 1405 – November 1405
- Predecessor: An-Nasir Faraj
- Successor: An-Nasir Faraj
- Born: After 1390
- Died: 20 September 1406
- Father: Sayf-ad-Din Barquq
- Mother: Qunnuq-Bey

Izz al-Din Abd al-Aziz (Arabic: المنصور عز الدين عبد العزيز بن برقوق; d. 20 September 1406) was the younger brother of An-Nasir Faraj and the son of Barquq.

He ruled briefly in 1405, when his brother An-Nasir Faraj escaped his rule, being afraid of the surrounding conspiracies. However, Faraj regained his position in November the same year.

== Sources ==
- Natho, Kadir I. (2009). Circassian History. Xlibris Corporation. ISBN 9781465316998.

Regnal titles
Preceded by An-Nasir Faraj	Mamluk Sultan of Egypt; 20 September 1405–November 1405	Succeeded by An-Nasir Faraj
