= Al-Adil Kitbugha =

Sultan of Egypt and Syria (r. 1294–1296)

Kitbugha كتبغا

Sultan of Egypt
- Reign: December 1294 – 7 December 1296
- Predecessor: An-Nasir Muhammad
- Successor: Lajin
- Died: 1303; Hama
Names
- al-Malik al-Adil Zayn-ad-Din Kitbugha Ben Abd-Allah al-Mansuri al-Turki al-Mughli
- Dynasty: Bahri
- Religion: Islam

use

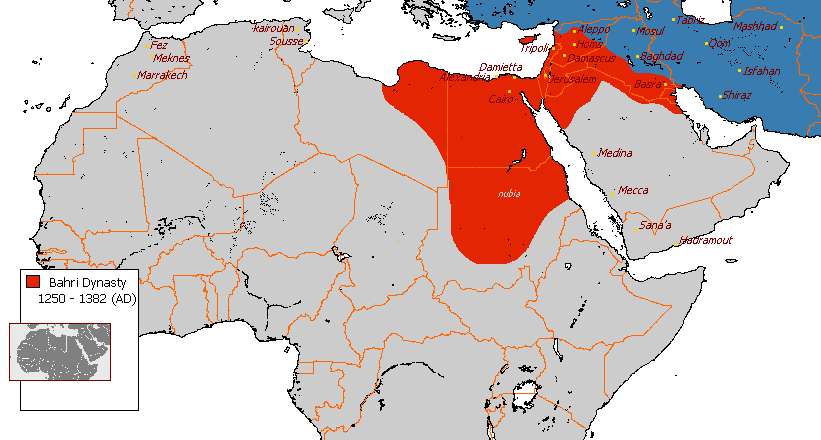
Dominion of Bahri Mamluks (shown in red)

Kitbugha (Arabic: كتبغا), royal name: al-Malik al-Adil Zayn-ad-Din Kitbugha Ben Abd-Allah al-Mansuri al-Turki al-Mughli; Arabic: الملك العادل زين الدين كتبغا بن عبد الله المنصوري التركي المغلي) (died 1303 CE) was the 10th Mamluk sultan of Egypt from December 1294 to November 1296.

== Background ==
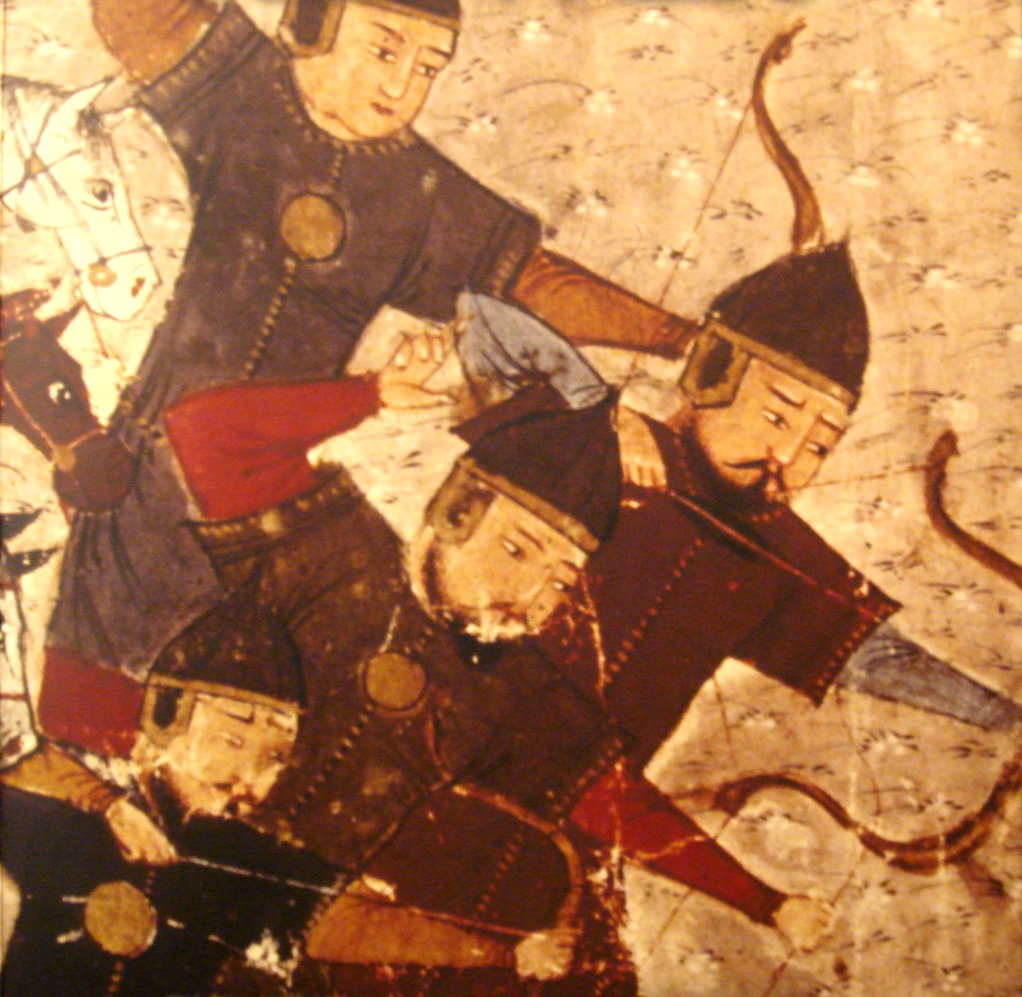
Mongol soldiers. BnF. MS. Supplément Persan 1113. 1430-1434 AD.

He was originally an Oirat Mongol (al-Turki al-Mughli) soldier in the Ilkhanid army of Hulagu. He was taken prisoner during the First Battle of Homs in 1260. He was purchased by Qalawun and became one of his Mamluks then later Qalawun manumitted him and granted him the rank of Emir.

During the reign of Qalawun's son Sultan Al-Ashraf Khalil, he was arrested and released. In 1293, after the assassination of Al-Ashraf Khalil, Kitbugha became the Vice-Sultan and Regent of Sultan Al-Nasir Muhammad. With Emir ‘Alam al-Din Sanjar al-Shuja‘i al-Mansuri (عَلَمُ الدِّينِ سَنْجَرُ الشُّجَاعِيُّ المَنْصُورِيُّ, romanised: ʿAlam ad-Dīn Sanǧar aš-Šuǧāʿī al-Manṣūrī) he was effectively the ruler of Egypt as Al-Nasir Muhammad was only 9 years old. But Kitbugha faced rivalry from and had a poor relationship with al-Shuja‘i who was an Al-Nasir's Vizier. Al-Shuja‘i, with the support of the Burji Mamluks, planned to arrest Kitbugha and assassinate his emirs, but Kitbugha was informed about al-Shuja‘i's plan by a Tatar named Qunghar. Kitbugha laid siege to the Citadel with the support of the Genghis-Khanites and the Shahrzuri Kurds. However, he was defeated by the Burji Mamluks and had to flee to Bilbays. He later returned to Cairo and laid siege to the Citadel again after his emirs defeated the Burjis. Kitbugha's siege of the Citadel lasted for seven days with daily clashes with the Sultani Mamluks and al-Shuja‘i supporters. Many of al-Shuja‘i's emirs moved over to Kitbugha's side. The emirs of Kitbugha informed Sultan Al-Nassir Muhammed's mother that the dispute was between them and al-Shuja‘i and not with her son. So she locked the gates of the Citadel with al-Shuja‘i trapped in his house outside the Citadel. After that more of his Emirs deserted him and moved over to the side of Kitbugha. Al-Shuja‘i, who was not popular among the Egyptians, was killed while he was on his way to the Citadel to discuss the dispute. When the gate of the Citadel was unlocked Kitbugha and his emirs went in. Kitbugha's followers who were imprisoned by al-Shuja‘i were freed and many Burji Mamluks who supported al-Shuja'i were either arrested or removed from the Citadel. Al-Shuja‘i's properties in the Levant were seized and his deputies there were arrested.

About 300 of the Burji Mamluks who were removed from the Citadel by Al-Adil Kitbugha rebelled and went on a rampage in Cairo. These Mamluks, known as the al-Mamalik al-Ashrafiyah Khalil (the Mamluks of al-Ashraf Khalil) were enraged because Hossam ad-Dain Lajin, who was involved in the murder of their benefactor, Sultan al-Ashraf Khalil, had arrived in Cairo but was not arrested and punished. The Ashrafiyah Khalil were defeated and many of them were killed and executed.

== Rise to power ==
Kitbugha continued as the regent and the actual ruler of Egypt with Al-Nasir Muhammad, being a child, merely the nominal Sultan. After the murder of Vizier al-Shuja‘i, Kitbugha became more powerful. He was then convinced by Lajin, who was aware that the Mamluks of Khalil and Sultan Al-Nasir Muhammed would want to seek revenge for the death of Sultan Khalil, to depose Al-Nasir and take on complete power. After the defeat of the rebelling Burji Mamluks, Kitbugha assembled the emirs at his office and told them: "The system of the Kingdom has been undermined. There can not be respect while Sultan Al-Nasir is young ". The emirs agreed and they decided to replace Al-Nasir Muhammed with Kitbugha. Al-Nasir Muhammed was removed with his mother to another section of the palace and later to Al Karak . Kitbugha was installed as Sultan and took the royal name Al-Adil. He made Lajin his Vice-Sultan.

== The Oirats ==
In 1296 a large group of Oirats, Mongol refugees, arrived in the Levant. They were led by Turghai, the son-in-law of Hulagu Khan. They had fled to the Levant from Ghazan. While some of the Oirat group was received warmly in Cairo by Kitbugha and then resided in the Cairene district of al-Hisiniyah, others were sheltered in the coastal towns of the Levant. The Oirats were not Muslims, but after they intermarried with Egyptian emirs and later with Egyptian commoners, they converted to Islam and merged with Egyptian society. However, as Kitbugha was himself of Mongol origin, his extraordinary generosity towards the Oirats made many emirs suspicious about his motives. This would be one of the factors that would later lead to his downfall.

== Loss of power ==
Later in the reign of Kitbugha, Egypt and the Levant faced shortages of water and food in addition to an epidemic that caused the death of many people in Egypt. Kitbugha was not popular among the Egyptians who regarded him as a bringer of ill-omens. Also, the Egyptian were not pleased with Kitbugha's generosity towards the Oirats who were not Muslims while they, the Egyptians, were suffering from high prices of food and economic hardship.

While Kitbugha was in Damascus the emirs decided to get rid of him. The emirs went to Kitbugha and met him while he was on his way to Egypt. Kitbugha was angry with Bisari, who was a prominent emir, and accused him of corresponding with the Mongols. Fearing that Kitbugha would arrest Bisari, the emirs, including Lajin, carried arms and went to the Dihliz of Kitbugha and clashed with his Mamluks. A few of Kitbugha's Mamluks were killed or injured. Kitbugha left the Dihliz through a back passage and fled to Damascus, accompanied by five of his Mamluks. The emirs were unable to catch him. Lajin was placed on the throne as the new Sultan of Egypt.

Kitbugha took refuge inside the citadel of Damascus, but at last he resigned and recognized Lajin as the new Sultan saying: "al-Sultan al-Malik al-Mansour ( Lajin ) is one of my Khushdashiya. I serve him and I obey him. I will stay inside the Citadel until the Sultan decide(s) what to do with me". Kitbugha left Damascus to rule in Salkhad. He ruled there for two years and 17 days.

In 1299 while Sultan Al-Nasir Muhammad was on his way to Syria with the Egyptian army to confront the invasion of Mahmud Ghazan, some Oirats conspired with some Mamluks of the Sultan to kill the Vice-Sultan Salar and the Ostadar, Baibars al-Jashnakir who were the actual rulers of Egypt. They wanted to bring Kitbugha back to power, but the attempt failed and the conspiring Oirats were severely punished. After the defeat of Al-Nasir Muhammad's army at the Battle of Wadi al-Khazandar, Kitbugha fled to Egypt and served Salar. After Ghazan left Syria Kitbugha became the deputy of Sultan Al-Nasir Muhammad in Hama, where he died in July 1303.

== Coins of Al-Adil Kitbugha ==
In 1295, during the reign of Sultan Kitbugha, it was decided for the first time in Egypt, that coins had to be weighed before being exchanged for goods or services. Thus the value of coins were based on their weight and not on their quantity.

== See also ==
- List of rulers of Egypt
- Bahri dynasty
- Al-Ashraf Khalil
- Lajin
- Oirats
- Qalawun

== Notes ==
Al-Adil Kitbugha Bahri dynasty Cadet branch of the Mamluk Sultanate Born: ? Died: 1297
Regnal titles
Preceded by Al-Nasir Muhammad	Sultan of Egypt and Syria; December 1294 – 7 December 1296	Succeeded by Lajin
