= Al-Salih Hajji =

As-Salih Hajji
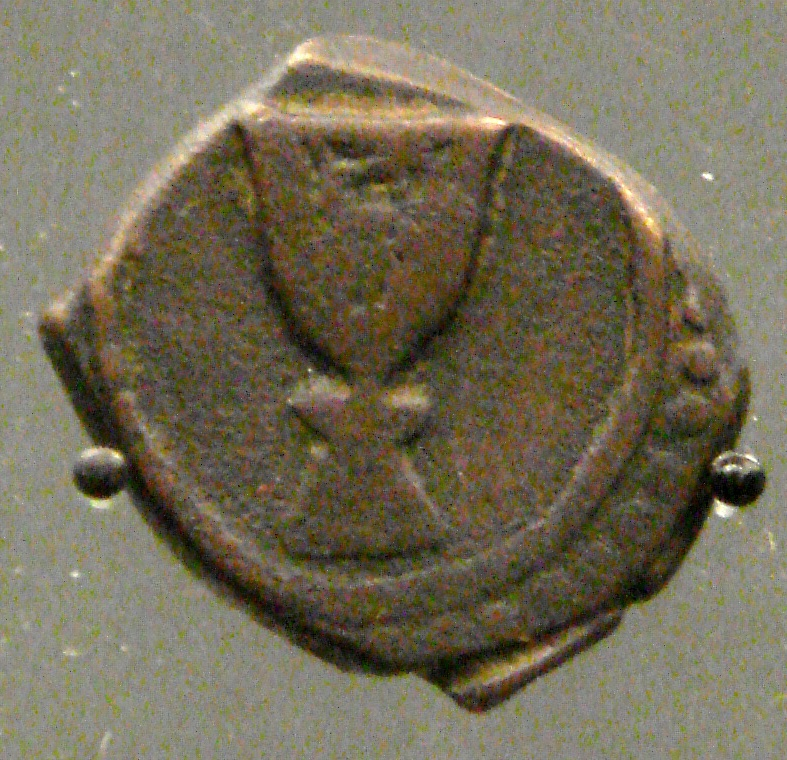
- Haji II copper fals, 1382.

Sultan of Egypt and Syria
- Reign: 21 May 1381 – 27 November 1382
- Predecessor: Al-Mansur Ali II, Sultan of Egypt
- Successor: Barquq

Sultan of Egypt and Syria
- Reign: 2 June 1389 – 1 February 1390
- Predecessor: Barquq
- Successor: Barquq
- Born: 1372; Cairo
- Died: 4 February 1412 (aged 40); Cairo
- Dynasty: Bahri
- Father: Al-Ashraf Sha'ban
- Religion: Islam

Al-Salih Hajji (Epithet: Al-Salih Salah Zein al-Din Hajji II), also Haji II, was a Bahri Turkic Mamluk ruler, and the last ruler of the Bahri dynasty in 1382. He briefly ruled again in 1389, during the advent of the Burji Circassian dynasty. He fell hostage to Sayf ad-Din Barquq before the small battle of Marj al-Saffar in 1390. He was the son of Al-Ashraf Sha'ban.

== Notes ==
Regnal titles
Preceded by Al-Mansur Ali	Mamluk Sultan; 1382	Succeeded by Barquq
Preceded by Barquq	Mamluk Sultan; 1389	Succeeded by Barquq
