= Barquq =

Sultan of Egypt and Syria (1382–1389, 1390–1399)

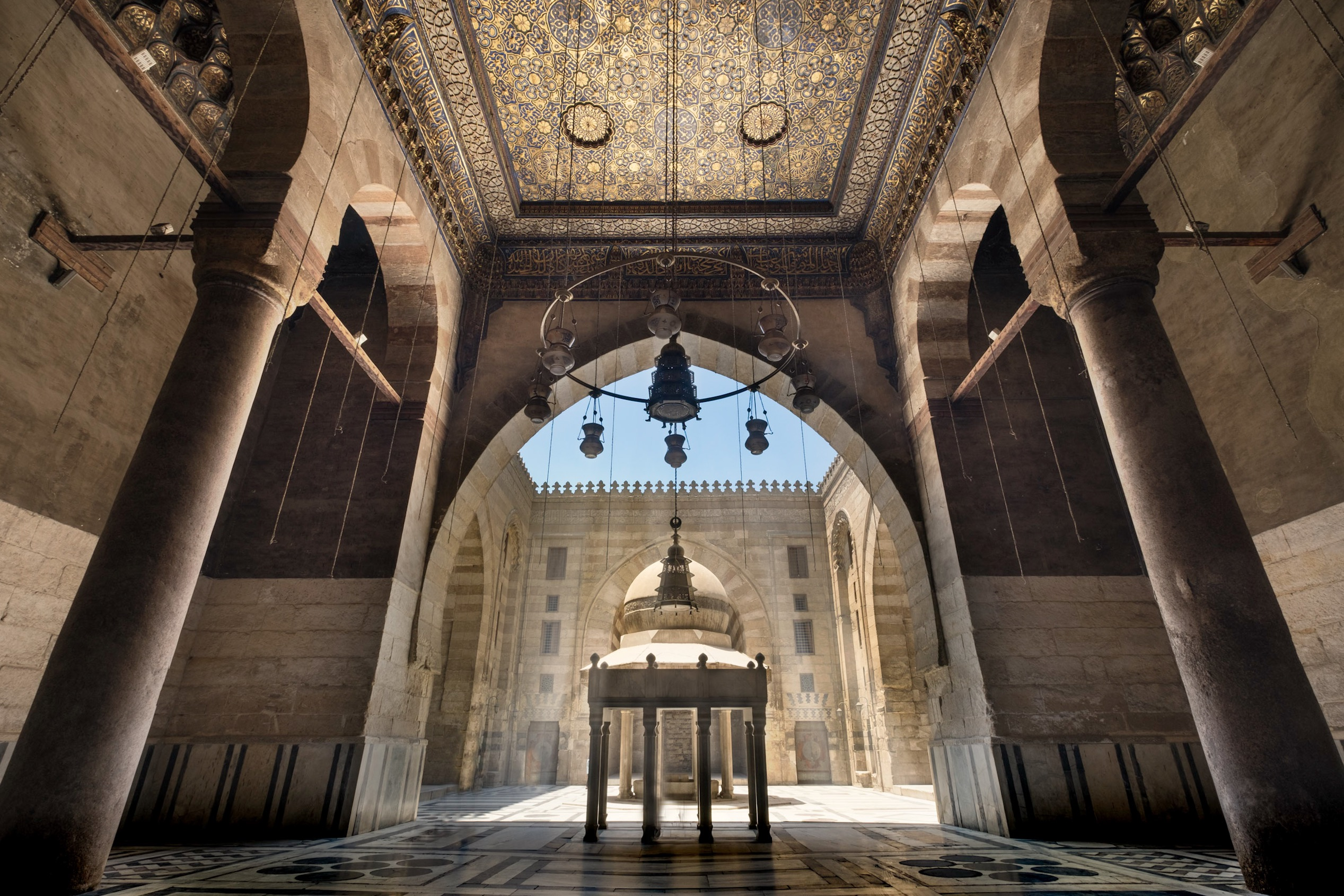
- Inside the Mosque-Madrasa of Sultan Barquq

Sultan of Egypt and Syria
- First reign: 1382–1389
- Predecessor: As-Salih Hajji
- Successor: As-Salih Hajji
- Second reign: 1390–1399
- Predecessor: As-Salih Hajji
- Successor: An-Nasir Faraj
- Born: c. 1336; Kasa, Circassia
- Died: 20 June 1399 (aged c. 63)
- Spouse: Khawand Fatima; Sitti Hajar; Tandu Khatun; Khawand Shirin; Qunnuq-Bey; Khawand Baraka; Sul; Khawand Hajj Malak
- Issue: An-Nasir Faraj; Izz ad-Din Abd al-Aziz; Ibrahim; Khawand Sara; Khawand Bairam; Khawand Zaynab
- Religion: Sunni Islam

Al-Malik Az-Zahir Sayf ad-Din Barquq (Arabic: الملك الظاهر سيف الدين برقوق; born c. 1336) was the first Sultan of the Circassian Mamluk Burji dynasty of Egypt ruling from 1382 to 1389 and 1390 to 1399. Born to a Christian father in Circassia, Barquq was enslaved and later arrived in Egypt. He deposed sultan al-Salih Hajji to claim the throne for himself. Once in power, he placed many of his family members in positions of power. Rebelling governors in 1389 restored Hajji to the throne but Barquq was able to reclaim the throne shortly after and ruled until his death in 1399 and was succeeded by his son. The name Barquq is of Circassian origin and is his birth name.

== Early life ==
Barquq was of Circassian origin, and was acquired as a slave, presumably after a battle, and sold to a bathhouse in Crimea. According to one narration, while trying to escape and secretly go to Constantinople, he was attacked by Bulgarian bandits and sold to Egypt, while according to another narration he was directly brought from Crimea to Egypt. In Egypt, he became a mamluk in the household of Yalbugha al-Umari in approximately 1363–64 (or 764 on the Islamic calendar). During the reign of Sultan al-Mansur Ali, when Barquq held considerable influence in the Mamluk state, he brought his father to Egypt in March 1381. His father, originally a Christian, converted to Islam, adopted the name Anas and became the first father of a first-generation mamluk to be mentioned by the Mamluk era sources because of his Muslim faith; the fathers of first generation mamluks were typically non-Muslims. Anas was promoted to the rank of emir of one hundred (the highest Mamluk military rank) and was known for his piety, kindness and charitable acts. He died ten months after his arrival to Egypt.

== Rise to power ==
Since 1341, the Mamluk empire had been ruled by the descendants of al-Nasir Muhammad. However, none of them were strong enough to exert effective control. Many of the rulers were minors at the time of their accession, and would act as puppets for one or another competing Mamluk faction.

This happened in 1377, when the sultan al-Ashraf Sha'ban, who had ruled in his own stead since 1366, was overthrown and killed. The rebelling Mamluks replaced him on the throne with his seven-year-old son. When that puppet sultan died, he was replaced by the younger brother, al-Salih Hajji.

Barquq was a member of the faction behind the throne, serving in various powerful capacities in the court of the boy sultans. He consolidated his power until in November 1382 when he was able to depose sultan al-Salih Hajji and claim the sultanate for himself. He took the reign name al-Zahir, perhaps in imitation of the sultan al-Zahir Baybars.

== First reign (1382–1389) ==
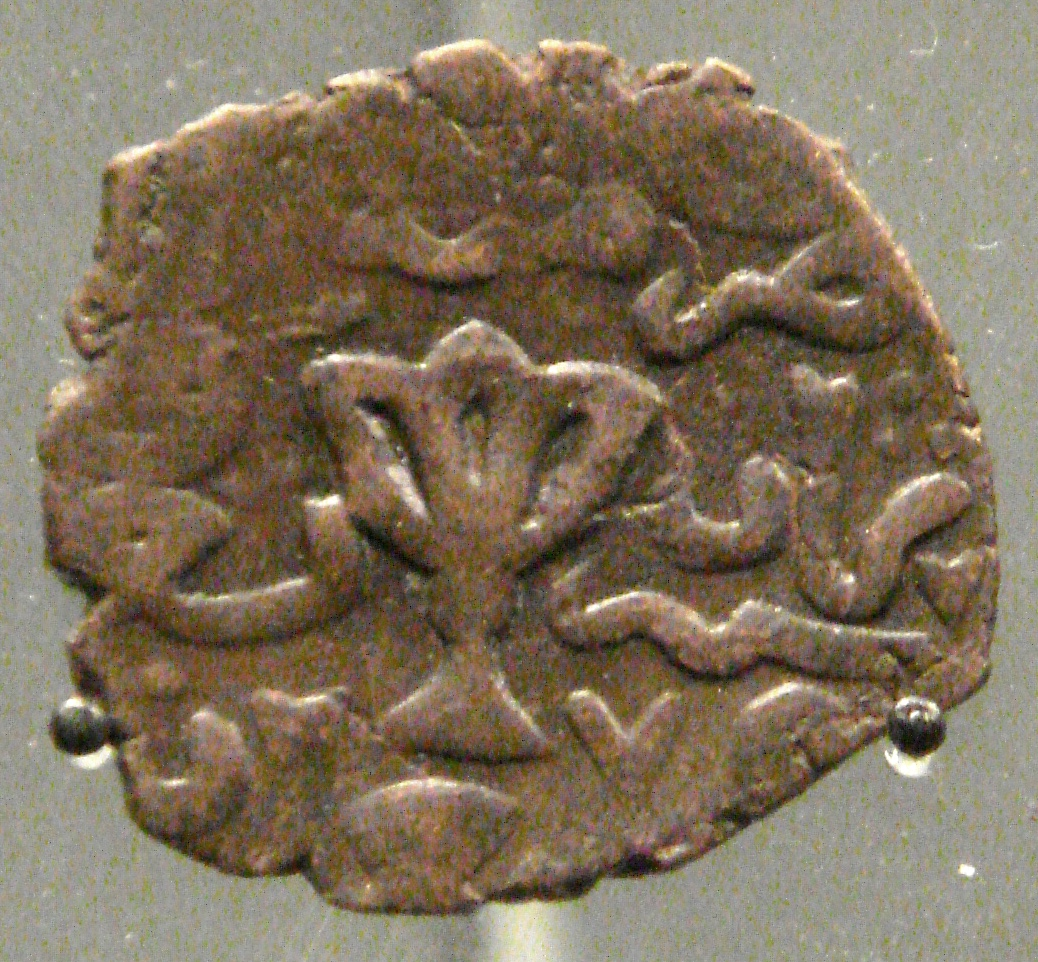
Mamluk Barquq copper fals Damascus 1382 1389, in the British Museum. Note the Fleur-de-lis motif

Barquq placed many of his own family in positions of power to the detriment of fellow Mamluks, attempting to solidify his position. He sponsored the construction of the Mosque-Madrasa of Sultan Barquq in the center of Cairo. Completed in 1386, it was a pious foundation designed to serve as both a khanqah and a madrasa. It is one of the three dominant Islamic monuments clustered on the street Bayn al-Qasrayn in Fatimid Cairo. Although often called the Mausoleum of Barquq, only his daughter is buried there.

Barquq ended the public holiday in Egypt celebrating the Coptic New Year Nayrouz.

The central caravanserai of the famous Cairo souk Khan El-Khalili was founded in the first year of his first reign, though it was founded by his emir, Djaharks el-Khalili.

== Revolt ==
Early on, the 1386 Zahiri Revolt threatened to overthrow Barquq, though the conspiracy was discovered before any agitators could mobilize. The year 1389 saw the revolt of two Mamluk governors from the northern end of the empire, Mintash, governor of Malatya, and Yalbogha al-Nasiri, governor of Aleppo (not to be confused with Yalbogha al-`Umari). After securing Syria they marched toward Cairo. Barquq attempted to escape, but was captured and sent to the castle of al-Karak. Meanwhile, the two governors restored Hajji to the throne, who now took the reign name al-Mansur. Fighting developed among the Mamluk factions in Cairo, and Barquq's supporters overcame the rebels. Barquq returned to Cairo in February 1390.

== Second reign (1390–1399) ==
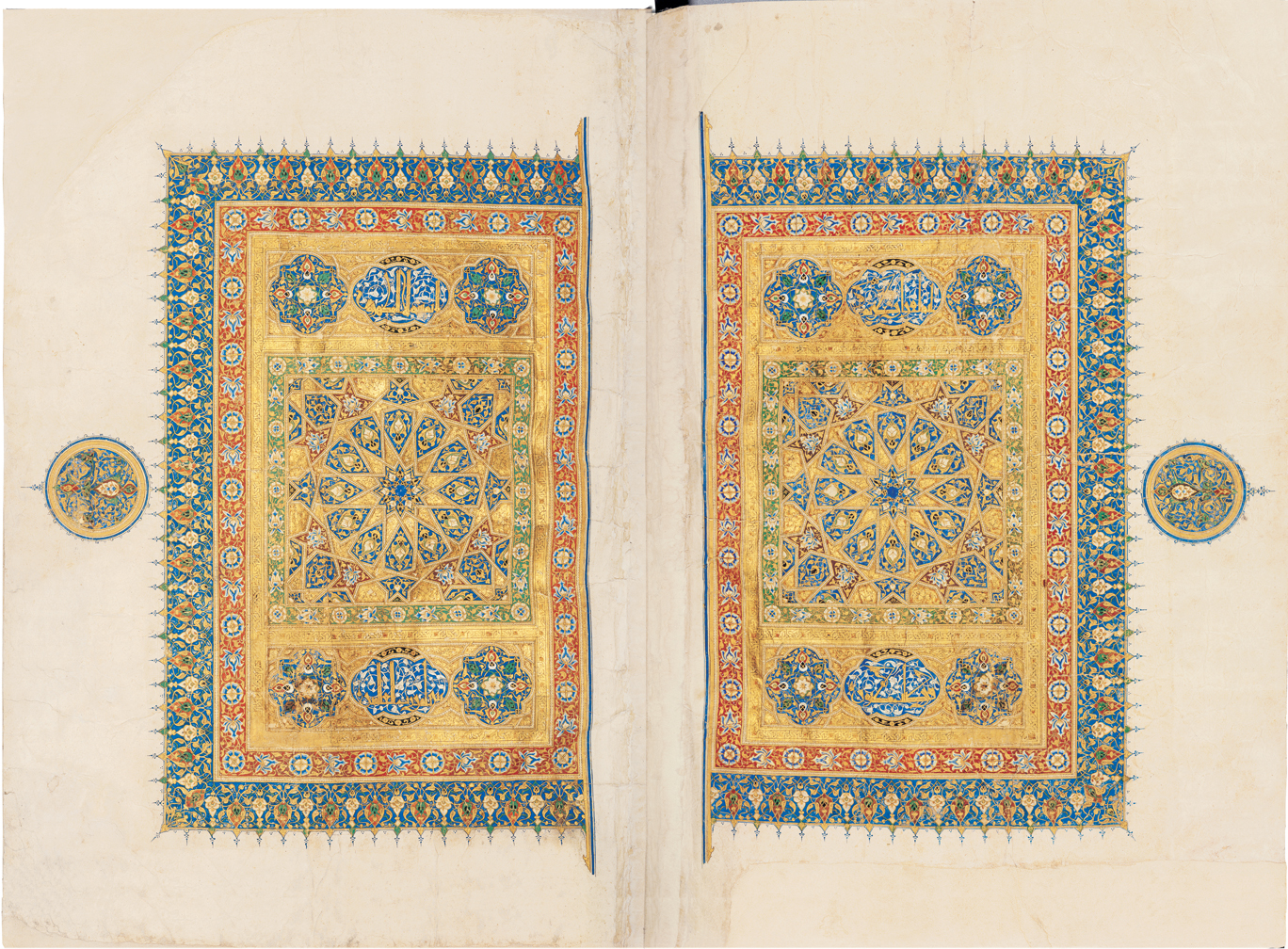
Illuminated frontispiece from the Qur'an commissioned by Barquq for his Complex. This manuscript is part of the National Library of Egypt's Collection of Mamluk Qur'an Manuscripts inscribed in the UNESCO Memory of the World Register

During Barquq's second reign he succeeded in replacing almost all governors and senior officials with members of his own household. Barquq became an enemy of the Turco-Mongol warlord Timur after Timur's invasion of Baghdad in 1393, and his intention to invade Syria. Hence, he joined an alliance with the Ottoman Empire after 1393.

Barquq died in June 1399 and was succeeded by his son Nasir-ad-Din Faraj. He was buried in a mausoleum built by Faraj in Cairo's Northern Cemetery.

== Family ==
Barquq's first wife was the daughter of Amir Tashtimur. They married on 17 April 1380, before his accession to the throne. In 1384, he married Khawand Fatima, the daughter of Amir Manjak al-Yusufi. On 12 February 1386, he married Sitti Hajar, the daughter of Amir Menglibogha as-Shamsi and Khwand Fatima, daughter of Sultan Al-Ashraf Sha'ban. With her, he had a daughter, Khawand Bairam. She died on 2 April 1430. In 1391, he married the daughter of Amir Ali bin Esendemir, the naib of Syria, and the same year he married the daughter of Ash-Shahabi Ahmad bin at-Tuluni.

Another wife was Tandu Khatun, the daughter of Shaykh Uways Jalayir, ruler of the Jalayirid Sultanate. They married on 11 February 1394. One of Barquq's concubines was Khawand Shirin. She was a Greek, and gave birth to Barquq's eldest son, An-Nasir Faraj. She died in 1399–1400, and was buried in the madrasa of Barquq at Bayn al-Qasrayn. Another concubine was Qunnuq-Bey. She was Turkish and gave birth to Barquq's second son, Izz ad-Din Abd al-Aziz. She died in 1432. One of Barquq's wives was Khawand Baraka. She was a free-born Syrian, and gave birth to Barquq's third son, Ibrahim. Another concubine was Sul, a singer.

Another wife was Khawand Hajj Malak. She descended from elite Turkish origins. Her father was either Ibn Qara or a royal mamluk named Muqbil. After Barquq's death she married Taghribirdi, the father of 15th-century historian Ibn Taghribirdi, and gave birth to his daughter Aisha also known as Shaqra. After his death, she married the Abbasid prince Yaqub bin al-Mutawakkil I and gave birth to the future caliph Al-Mutawakkil II. She died in 1429.

One of his daughters, Khawand Sara, born of a concubine, married Nawruz al-Hafizi, the amir kabir on 1 September 1401, and later Muqbil ar-Rumi. She died in 1409–10 on the road to Damascus. Another daughter, Khawand Bairam married Amir Inal Bay ibn Qijmas on 15 September 1401, then Baighut, and then Asanbugha Zarkadash. She died of plague in 1416. Another daughter, Khawand Zaynab, born of a Greek concubine, married Sultan Al-Mu'ayyad Shaykh. She died in 1423.

== Legacy ==
Sultan Barquq's reign was also marked by trade with other contemporaneous polities. Excavations in the late 1800s and early 1900s in modern-day northwestern Somalia unearthed, among other things, coins identified as having been derived from Barquq. All of the pieces had been struck in either Cairo or Damascus. Most of these finds are associated with the medieval Sultanate of Adal. They were sent to the British Museum in London for preservation shortly after their discovery.

== See also ==
- List of rulers of Egypt
- Sayyid Husayn Ahlati

== Bibliography ==
- Yiğit, Fatma Akkuş (2015-06-01). "Memlûkler'de Evlilik Hazırlıkları". Türkiyat Mecmuası (in Turkish). 25 (1): 331–351. doi:10.18345/tm.94303.
- Yiğit, Fatma Akkuş (2016-04-20). "Memlûk Sarayında Tek Eşlilik ve Çok Eşlilik Üzerine Bir İnceleme" (PDF). Journal of International Social Research. 9 (43). The Journal of International Social Research: 556. doi:10.17719/jisr.20164317631. ISSN 1307-9581.
- Margoliouth, D.S. (1907). Cairo, Jerusalem, and Damascus: three chief cities of the Egyptian sultans. New York, Dodd, Mead and company.
- Al-Maqrizi, Al Selouk Leme'refatt Dewall al-Melouk, Dar al-kotob, 1997.
  - Idem in English: Bohn, Henry G., The Road to Knowledge of the Return of Kings, Chronicles of the Crusades, AMS Press, 1969.
- Holt, P.M. (2014). The Age of the Crusades: the Near East from the Eleventh Century to 1517. Routledge. ISBN 978-1-317-87152-1.
- Mayer, L.A. (1933). Saracenic Heraldry: A Survey. Oxford: Oxford University Press. (pp. 29 n, 31, 35 f*, 57, 69, 90*f.*, 92, 96, 114*f*, 126, 147, 172, 185, 200, 216*, 225, 247, 253 ff, 257)
- Muir, W. (1896). The Mameluke; or, Slave dynasty of Egypt, 1260-1517, A. D. Smith, Elder. pp. 105−116.
- Sharon, M. (2013). Corpus Inscriptionum Arabicarum Palaestinae, H-I. Vol. 5. BRILL. ISBN 978-90-04-25097-0.
- Williams, Caroline (2002). Islamic Monuments in Cairo: the Practical Guide. American University in Cairo Press. ISBN 977-424-695-0.

Regnal titles
Preceded by Hajji II	Mamluk Sultan of Egypt; 1382–1389	Succeeded by Hajji II
Preceded by Hajji II	Mamluk Sultan of Egypt; 1390–1399	Succeeded by Faraj
