= Bahri Mamluks =

Egyptian dynasty (1250–1382)

State of the Turks دولة الأتراك (Arabic) Dawlat al-Atrāk
- 1250–1382
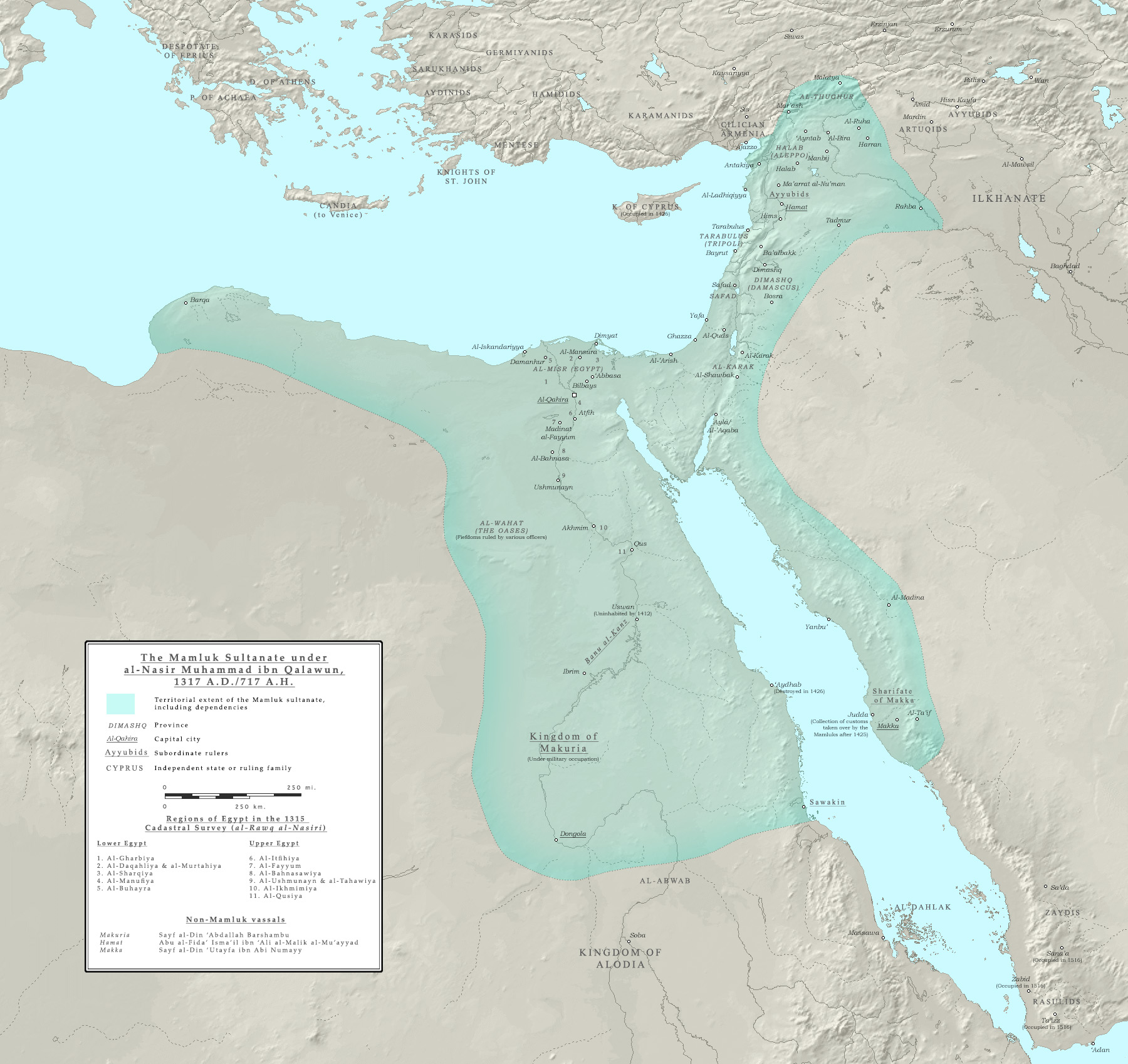
- The Mamluk Sultanate circa 1317 AD
- Status: Sultanate with ceremonial caliph
- Capital: Cairo
- Religion: Sunni Islam
- History
  - Established: 1250
  - Disestablished: 1382
Preceded by	Succeeded by
Ayyubid dynasty	Burji Mamluks

The Bahri Mamluks (Arabic: المماليك البحرية, romanized: al-Mamalik al-Baḥariyya), sometimes referred to as the Bahri dynasty, were the rulers of the Mamluk Sultanate of Egypt from 1250 to 1382, following the Ayyubid dynasty. The members of the Mamluk ruling class were purchased as slaves (mamluks) and manumitted, with the most powerful among them taking the role of sultan in Cairo. While several Bahri Mamluk sultans tried to establish hereditary dynasties through their sons, these attempts were ultimately unsuccessful, with the role of sultan often passing on to another powerful Mamluk.

The Bahri Mamluks were of mostly Kipchak Turkic origin. Fourteen of eighteen sultans between 1279 and 1390 belonged to the Qalawunid lineage. After 1382/1390, they were succeeded by a second Mamluk regime, the Burji Mamluks, who were largely of Circassian origin.

== Name ==
The name Bahri or Bahriyya means 'of the river', referring to the location of their original barracks on Roda Island in the Nile (Nahr al-Nil) in Cairo, (Note: There is another theory about the origin of the name which states that they were called 'Bahariyya' because they came by sea or from over sea.) at the citadel of Al-Rodah which was built by the Ayyubid sultan as-Salih Ayyub. (Note: After the al-Rodah citadel was built, As-Salih took up residence there with his Mamluks. Later, the Mamluk sultans lived at the Cairo Citadel which was situated on the Muqattam Hills near Cairo.)

Arabic sources throughout the Mamluk period, especially during the Bahri period, referred to the Mamluk state as Dawlat al-Atrak, Dawlat al-Turk, or al-Dawla al-Turkiyya, meaning 'State of the Turks'. This name emphasized the Turkic ethnic origins of the Mamluks who founded the Bahri dynasty, while Mamluk writers generally avoided explicit reference to their slave ("mamluk") origins.

== History ==
The Mamluks formed one of the most powerful and wealthiest empires of the time, lasting from 1250 to 1517 in Egypt, North Africa, and the Levant—Near East.

=== Development ===
In 1250, when the Ayyubid sultan as-Salih Ayyub died, the Mamluks he had owned as slaves murdered his son and heir al-Muazzam Turanshah, and Shajar al-Durr the widow of as-Salih became the Sultana of Egypt. She married the Atabeg (commander in chief) Emir Aybak and abdicated, Aybak becoming Sultan. He ruled from 1250 to 1257. (Note: See also Shajar al-Durr and Aybak)

The Mamluks consolidated their power in ten years and eventually established the Bahri dynasty. They were indirectly helped by the Mongols' sack of Baghdad in 1258, which effectively destroyed the Abbasid caliphate. Cairo became more prominent as a result and remained a Mamluk capital thereafter.

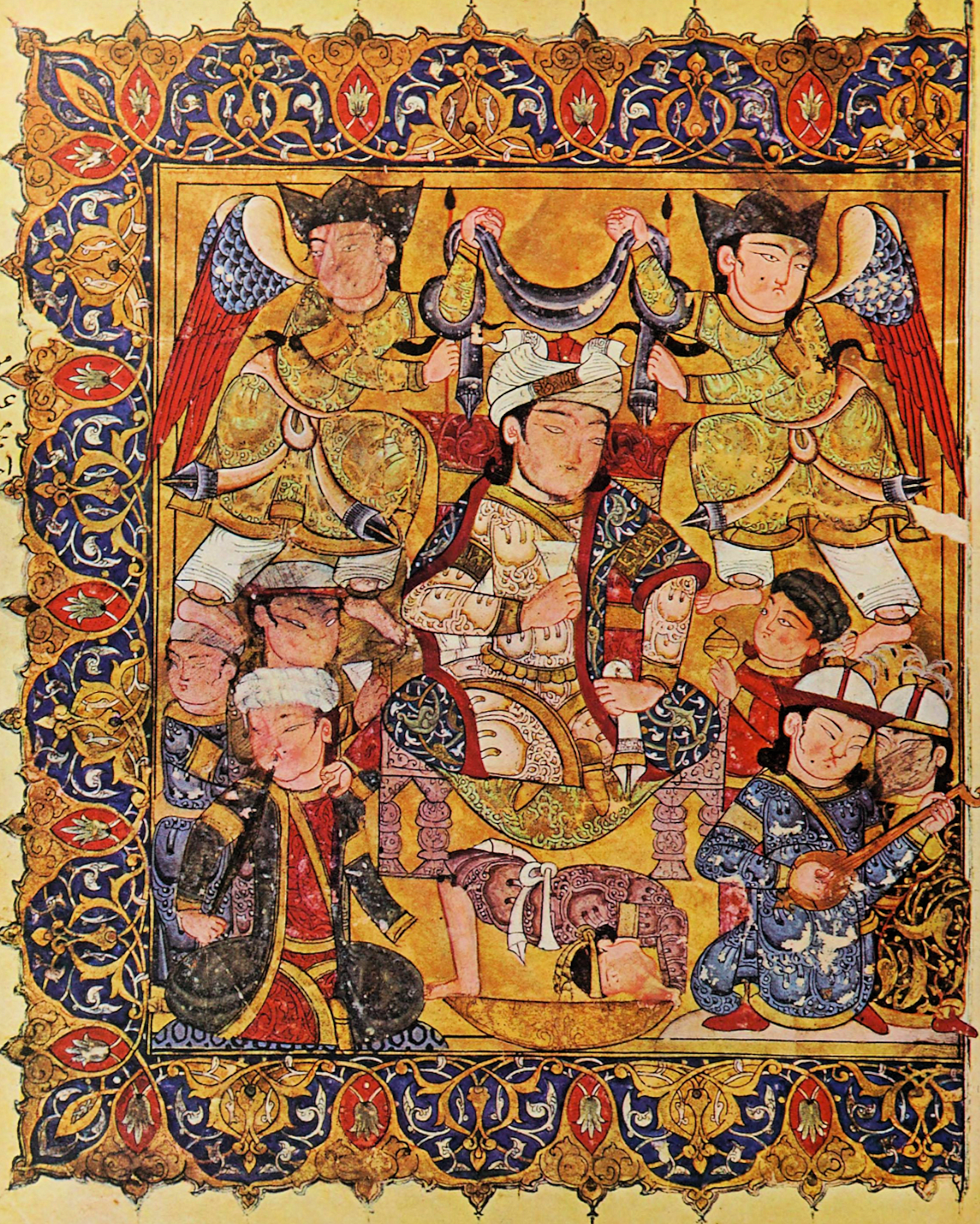
Enthroned Prince. Probably Egypt 1334. Maqamat of al-Hariri. "In the paintings the facial cast of these [ruling] Turks is obviously reflected, and so are the special fashions and accoutrements they favored".

The Mamluks were powerful cavalry warriors mixing the practices of the Turkic steppe peoples from which they were drawn and the organizational and technological sophistication and horsemanship of the Arabs. In 1260 the Mamluks defeated a Mongol army at the Battle of Ain Jalut in Palestine and eventually forced the invaders to retreat to the area of modern-day Iraq. The defeat of the Mongols at the hands of the Mamluks enhanced the position of the Mamluks in the southern Mediterranean basin. (Note: The victory of the Mamluks against the Mongols brought an end to the Ayyubid's claim in Egypt and the Levant . Ayyubid Emirs recognized the Mamluk Sultan as their sovereign.) Baibars, one of the leaders at the battle, became the new Sultan after the assassination of Sultan Qutuz on the way home. (Note: Qutuz was assassinated near al-Salihiyah, Egypt. Those murdered him were emir Badr ad-Din Baktut, emir Ons and emir Bahadir al-Mu'izzi.)

In 1250 Baibars was one of the Mamluk commanders who defended Mansurah against the Crusade knights of Louis IX of France, who was later definitely defeated, captured in the Battle of Fariskur and ransomed. Baibars had also taken part in the Mamluk takeover of Egypt. In 1261, after he became a Sultan, he established a puppet Abbasid caliphate in Cairo, (Note: Sultan Baibars recognized the Sovereignty of Abu al-Qasim Ahmad as the Abbasid Caliph in Cairo only in religious matters after a few Bedouins witnessed Fariskurbefore the supreme judge of Egypt that he was the son of the Abbasid Caliph Al-Zahir Billah. The Caliph took the name al-Mustansir Billah. Though the Abbasid Caliphs in Cairo during the Mamluk era legitimated the sovereignty of the Mamluks' Sultans, the Caliphs were actually powerless. However, contrary to the Ayyubids who were to some degree dependent on the Abbasid Chaliph in Baghdad, the fact that the Chaliph lived in Cairo gave the Mamluks independency and full freedom of action.) and the Mamluks fought the remnants of the Crusader states in Palestine until they finally captured Acre in 1291. (Note: See al-Ashraf Khalil)

==== Tatars and Mongols ====
Many Tatars settled in Egypt and were employed by Baibars. (Note: In 1262, during the reign of Sultan Baibars, many Tartars from the Golden Horde tribe escaped from Hulagu to Egypt and were followed later by other Tartars. Baibars welcomed the Tartars and employed them in the army. They had their own army unit which was called al-Firqah al-Wafidiyah (the arrivals unite). Throughout the Mamluk era, the Wafidiyya (arriving Tartars) were free men and the Mamluk system did not apply to them. Baibars resided the Tartars in Cairo and gave them various official posts. The largest group of Tartars immigrated to Egypt in 1296 during the reign of Sultan Al-Adil Kitbugha who was himself of Mongol origin. They resided at the district of al-Hisiniyah in Cairo and many of their women married Mamluk Emirs.) He defeated the Mongols at the battle of Elbistan and sent the Abbasid Caliph with only 250 men to attempt to retake Baghdad, but was unsuccessful. In 1266 he devastated Cilician Armenia and in 1268 he recaptured Antioch from the Crusaders. (Note: Cilician Armenia was devastated by Sultan Baibars's commander Qalawun upon the Battle of Mari in 1266. The Principality of Antioch was destroyed by Sultan Baibars in 1268.) In addition, he fought the Seljuks, (Note: Baibars defeated both the Seljuks and the Mongols at the battle of Elbistan.) and Hashshashin; he also extended Muslim power into Nubia for the first time, before his death in 1277.

Sultan Qalawun defeated a rebellion in Syria that was led by Sunqur al-Ashqar in 1280, (Note: Shams ad-Din Sunqur al-Ashqar was a prominent emir and one of the most devoted Bahri emirs since the days of Sultan Baibars. He was taken prisoner by the Armenians and was freed in exchange for Leo the son of King Hethum I, King of Armenia who was captured during the invasion of the Armenian Kingdom of Cilicia in 1266. During the reign of Baibars' son Solamish, he was the deputy of the Sultan in Damascus. During the reign of Qalawun, Sunqur al-Ashqar proclaimed himself a Sultan while in Damascus, taking the royal name al-Malik al-Kamil. Sunqur al-Ashqar fought a few battles against Sultan Qalawun's Emirs but was pardoned later after he joined Qalawun's army against the Mongols.) and also defeated another Mongol invasion in 1281 that was led by Abaqa outside Homs. After the Mongol threat passed he recaptured Tripoli from the Crusaders in 1289. His son Khalil captured Acre, the last Crusader city, in 1291.

Territory of the Golden Horde in 1389

The Mongols renewed their invasion in 1299, but were again defeated in 1303 in the Battle of Shaqhab. The Egyptian Mamluk Sultans entered into relations with the Golden Horde who converted to Islam (Note: Sultan Baibars sent his first emissaries to Berke Khan the ruler of the Golden Horde in 1261) and established a peace pact with the Mongols in 1322.

Sultan Al-Nasir Muhammad married a Mongol princess in 1319. His diplomatic relations were more extensive than those of any previous Sultan, and included Bulgarian, Indian, and Abyssinian potentates, as well as the pope, the king of Aragon and the king of France. Al-Nasir Muhammad organized the re-digging of a canal in 1311 which connected Alexandria with the Nile. He died in 1341.

=== Decline ===
The constant changes of sultans that followed led to great disorder in the provinces. Meanwhile, in 1349 Egypt and the Levant in general were introduced to Black Death, which is said to have killed many inhabitants. (Note: The Black Death probably began in Central Asia and spread to Europe by the late 1340s. The total number of deaths worldwide from the pandemic is estimated at 75 million people; there were an estimated 25-50 million deaths in Europe.)

In 1382 the last Bahri Sultan Hajji II was dethroned and the Sultanate was taken over by the Circassian Emir Barquq. He was expelled in 1389 but returned to power in 1390, setting up an era where the sultanate was controlled by the Burji Mamluks.

== Military organization ==
On a general level, the military during the Bahri dynasty can be divided into several aspects:

- Mamluks: The core of both the political and military base, these slave soldiers were further divided into Khassaki (comparable to imperial guards), Royal Mamluks (Mamluks directly under the command of the Sultan) and regular Mamluks (usually assigned to local Amirs).
- Al-Halqa: These primarily free born professional forces were also directly under the sultan's command.
- Wafidiyya: Turks and Mongols that migrated to the dynasty's border after the Mongol invasion, typically given land grants in exchange for military service; they were well regarded forces.
- Other levies: Primarily Bedouin tribes, but also on different occasions also different groups of Turkmens and Arabs.

== List of Bahri Sultans ==
While the Mamluk rulers before al-Zahir Baybars are generally considered part of the Bahri period, they were not part of the Bahriyya Mamluks and actually opposed their political interests. Shajar al-Durr was not a Mamluk, but is generally included in the lists due to the nature of her ascent and her status as a concubine of as-Salih Ayyub.

1. Shajar al-Durr, widow of Ayyubid Sultan as-Salih Ayyub, 1250
2. al-Mu'izz Aybak, mamluk of as-Salih Ayyub, 1250 (Note: Aybak's first reign lasted just under a week before conflict with Ayyubids and Abbasid caliph forced him to install an Ayyubid al-Ashraf Musa as the nominal Sultan, while he held the real power as an atabeg. al-Ashraf Musa ruled till 1254, when Aybak deposed him and declared himself sultan.), 1254–1257
3. al-Mansur Ali, son of Aybak, 1257–1259
4. al-Muzaffar Qutuz, mamluk of Aybak, 1259–1260
5. al-Zahir Baybars, mamluk of as-Salih Ayyub, 1260–1277
6. al-Sa'id Baraka, son of Baybars, 1277–1279
7. al-Adil Salamish, son of Baybars, 1279
8. al-Mansur Qalawun, mamluk of Aybak, 1279–1290
9. al-Ashraf Khalil, son of Qalawun, 1290–1293
10. an-Nasir Muhammad, son of Qalawun, 1293–1294, 1299–1309, 1310–1341
11. al-Adil Kitbugha, mamluk of Qalawun, 1294–1296
12. al-Mansur Lajin, mamluk of Qalawun, 1296–1299
13. al-Muzaffar Baybars II, mamluk of Qalawun, 1309–1310
14. al-Mansur Abu-Bakr, son of an-Nasir Muhammad, 1341
15. al-Ashraf Kujuk, son of an-Nasir Muhammad, 1341–1342
16. an-Nasir Ahmad, son of an-Nasir Muhammad, 1342
17. as-Salih Ismail, son of an-Nasir Muhammad, 1342–1345
18. al-Kamil Sha'ban, son of an-Nasir Muhammad, 1345–1346
19. al-Muzaffar Hajji, son of an-Nasir Muhammad, 1346–1347
20. an-Nasir Hasan, son of an-Nasir Muhammad, 1347–1351, 1354–1361
21. as-Salih Salih, son of an-Nasir Muhammad, 1351–1354
22. al-Mansur Muhammad, son of Hajji, 1361–1363
23. al-Ashraf Sha'ban II, grandson of an-Nasir Muhammad, 1363–1377
24. al-Mansur Ali II, son of Sha'ban II, 1377–1381
25. as-Salih Hajji II, son of Sha'ban II, 1381-1382, 1389-1390

In 1382 the Burji period began when Barquq, a Circassian mamluk and regent of Hajji II, deposed him. Hajji II was briefly restored in 1389 when Barquq was overthrown, but Barquq soon took his position back.

== See also ==
- Black Sea slave trade
- Timeline of the Turkic peoples (500–1300)
- Egypt in the Middle Ages
- List of Sunni dynasties
