= Mosque of Amir al-Maridani =

Mosque in Cairo, Egypt

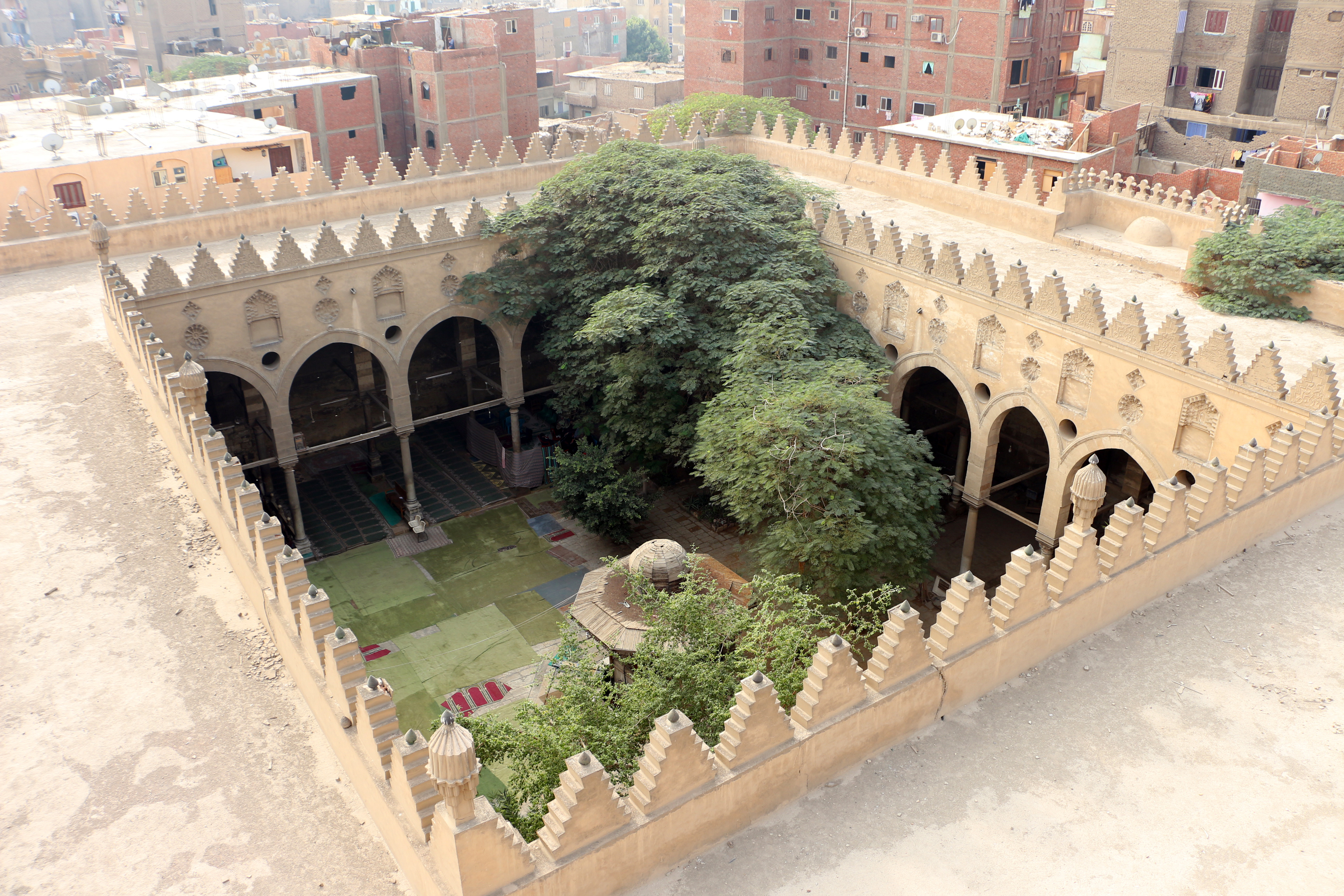

Religion
- Affiliation: Islam
- Ecclesiastical or organisational status: Mosque
- Status: Active

Location
- Location: Al-Darb al-Ahmar, Islamic Cairo
- Country: Egypt
- Interactive map of Mosque of Amir al-Maridani
- Coordinates: 30°02′23″N 31°15′33″E

Architecture
- Type: Mosque
- Style: Mamluk
- Founder: Altinbugha al-Maridani
- Groundbreaking: 1338–1339
- Completed: 1340

Specifications
- Dome: 1
- Minaret: 1

The Mosque of Amir al-Maridani, also known as the Mosque of Amir Altinbugha al-Maridani, is a mosque located south of Bab Zuweila, in the Darb al-Ahmar neighbourhood of Islamic Cairo, Egypt. The mosque dates from 1340, during the Mamluk Sultanate era. It was built by Amir Altinbugha al-Maridani, with significant help from Sultan al-Nasir Muhammad, on what was then the outskirts of medieval Cairo.

The mosque has a hypostyle plan similar to the Mosque of al-Nasir, and its exterior walls are decorated in typical Mamluk architectural style. At the time of its building, it was one of the most extravagantly decorated mosques in Cairo, marked by the first fully octagonal minaret and large dome, as well as other architectural innovations. Its history and luxuriousness are directly correlated to the life and prominence of al-Maridani, as it was built with the patronage of his father-in-law, the sultan, and significant donations from al-Maridani's own fortune.

== History ==
=== Background: Altinbugha al-Maridani ===
Al-Maridani first rose to prominence as the cupbearer of Sultan al-Nasir Muhammad. He gained this position at the unusually early age of 16. The sultan continued to favor al-Maridani and gave him his daughter in marriage, thus becoming his father-in-law. He also appointed al-Maridani as the chief of Cairo's police force and made him "amir of a thousand". After al-Nasir Muhammad's death, al-Maridani's career went through a crisis under the brief reign of al-Mansur Abu Bakr but he continued to prosper under the reigns of al-Ashraf Kujuk and al-Salih Isma'il. Ultimately, he died as the governor of Aleppo in 1343.

=== Construction ===
The site chosen for the mosque is in an area that was originally a cemetery outside Cairo and is now known as al-Darb al-Ahmar. By al-Maridani's time, it had begun to urbanize and people had built houses in the area. In the 14th century, the main street here turned into a ceremonial road between the city of Cairo and the royal Citadel to the south. In 738 AH (1337/1338 CE), al-Maridani purchased the houses on the site of his future mosque at half value and demolished them to make way for construction.

The construction dates of the mosque are recorded in three inscriptions found in the building. An inscription on the west entrance of the mosque dates its foundation to 739 AH (1338/1339 CE), while two inscriptions on the northern entrance and another on the minaret show that the mosque was completed in the month of Ramadan in 740 AH (1339/1340 CE). Al-Maridani, who was severely ill during this time, was motivated to donate considerable funds for the construction. Al-Nasir Muhammad further favoured his son-in-law by lending him his master builder (al-mu'allim), al-Suyufi, for the project. He also contributed wood and marble for construction. According to 14th-century writer al-Maqrizi, (Note: One of the only historical sources of information about the Mosque of Amir al-Maridani is the Cairene historian al-Maqrizi. In his two volume work Mawaiz wa al-'i'tibar bi dhikr al-khitat wa al-'athar (al-Khitat), Maqrizi describes the physical layout of medieval Cairo in exact detail, including buildings' construction histories and their connections to greater Cairene society. It remains the most useful source of information on buildings and their significance in medieval Cairo. However, he does not provide much background for the Mosque of Amir al-Maridani: he only shares how the site was acquired, some brief summarizing details about the mosque's construction, and Amir al-Maridani's later life history.) the construction cost around 300,000 dirhams, not counting the donations made by the sultan.

=== Restorations ===
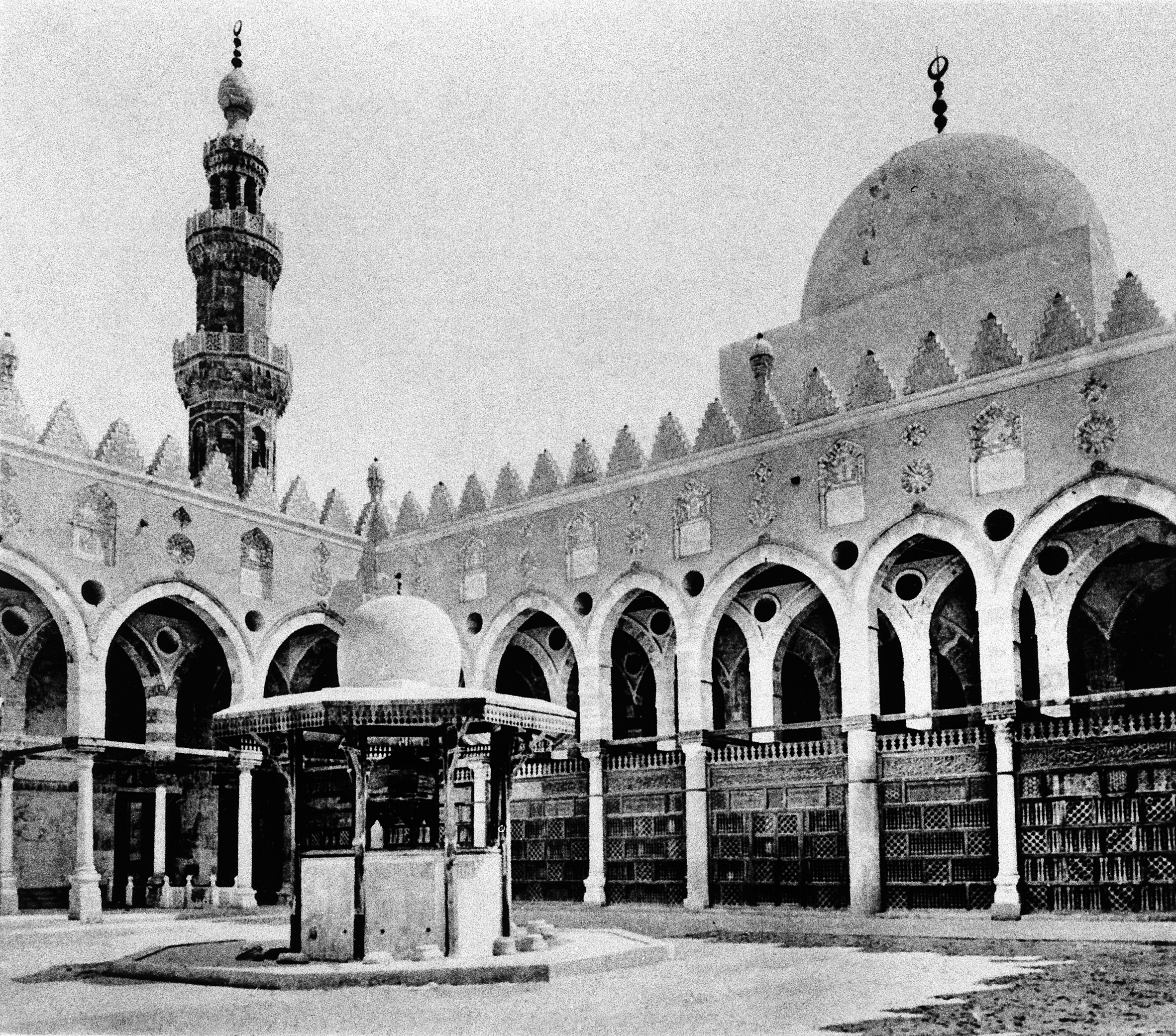
The mosque in 1905, following restoration by the Comité

The mosque was restored by the Comité de Conservation des Monuments de l'Art Arabe in 1895–1903. Since then, however, it suffered from neglect and progressive deterioration. Along with the usual accumulation of dust and grime from the desert environment of Cairo and urban pollution, the mosque suffered from humidity and water damage due to the rising water table and leaking sewage from the surrounding neighborhood. The prayer hall (or sanctuary) was in particularly bad condition. Cracks appeared in the walls and the marble panel decoration was made particularly vulnerable. Between 2007 and 2010, the wooden insets that make up the ornament of the minbar were looted.

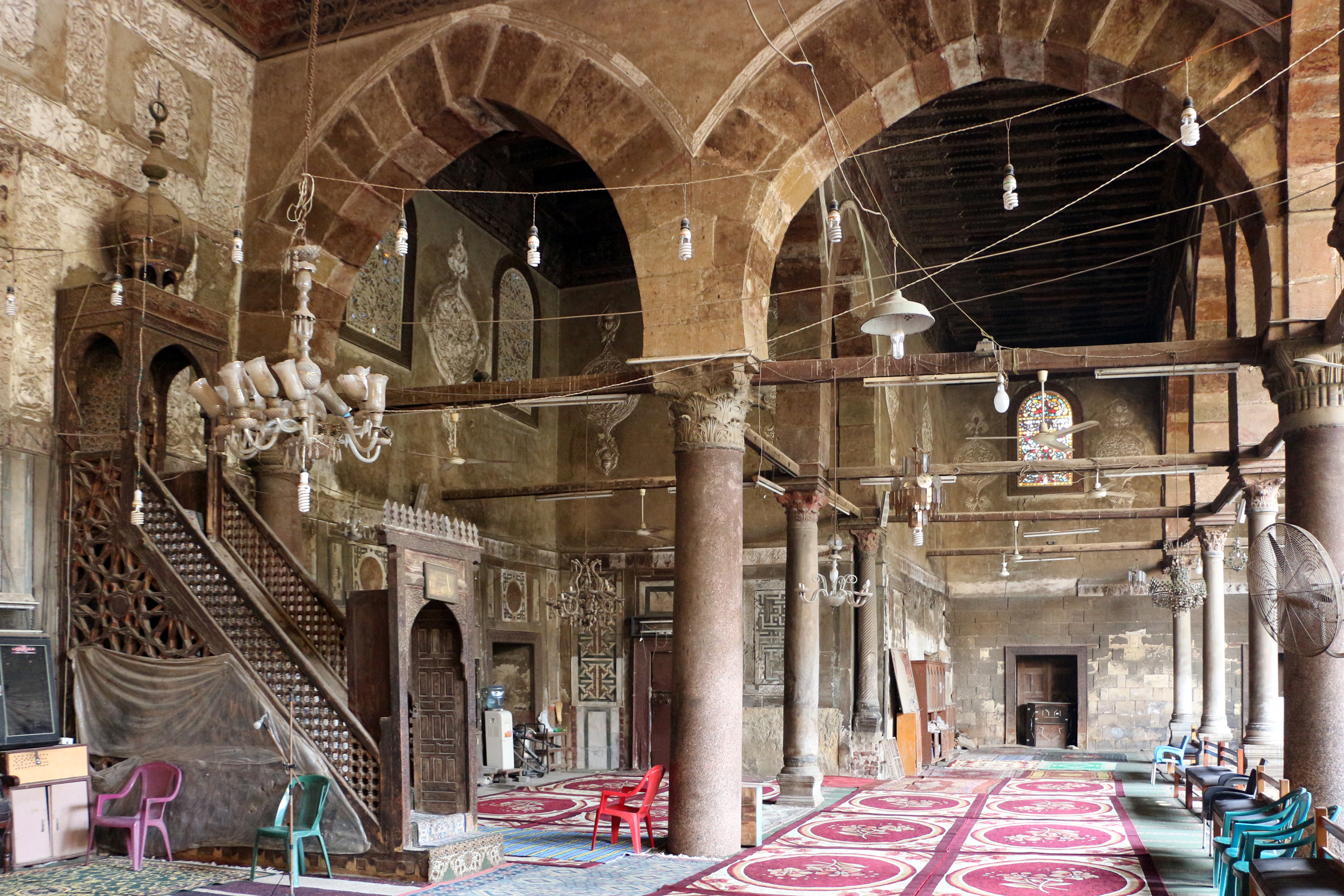
The prayer hall as it appeared in 2015, prior to the most recent restoration

A major restoration and rehabilitation project was begun in 2018 by the Egyptian government in collaboration with the Aga Khan Cultural Services-Egypt (part of the Aga Khan Development Network), and scheduled to last until 2020. It focused on restoring the prayer hall and aimed to integrate the mosque into a tourist route along the Darb al-Ahmar district. The initial estimated cost of the project was E£30 million, financed by the European Union. The first phase of the project, including restoration of the prayer hall and the eastern parts of the mosque, was completed in June 2021. The second phase began in 2022. The mosque was re-opened with an official ceremony on 28 May 2024.

== Architecture ==
=== Layout ===
The Mosque of Amir al-Maridani is built with both hypostyle and riwaq plans, similar to Sultan Al-Nasir Muhammad's mosque in the Citadel, with a dome above the mihrab and three axial entrances. A similar riwaq plan is found in the mosques of Amir Husayn, Bashtak, Ulmas, Sitt Miska/Hadaq, Aqsunqur, Qawsun, and Arghun Shah al-Isma'ili. A pattern of three axial entrances is also found at the mosques of al-Zahir Baybars and al-Nasir Muhammad.

The mosque is not rectangular, however, because of the constraints of urban construction. Specifically, the northeastern corner was built so that it would not encroach upon Tabanna Street nor a neighboring small lane. It is not, however, as irregular as some mosques in urban Cairo, such as Ulmas' mosque.

=== Exterior ===
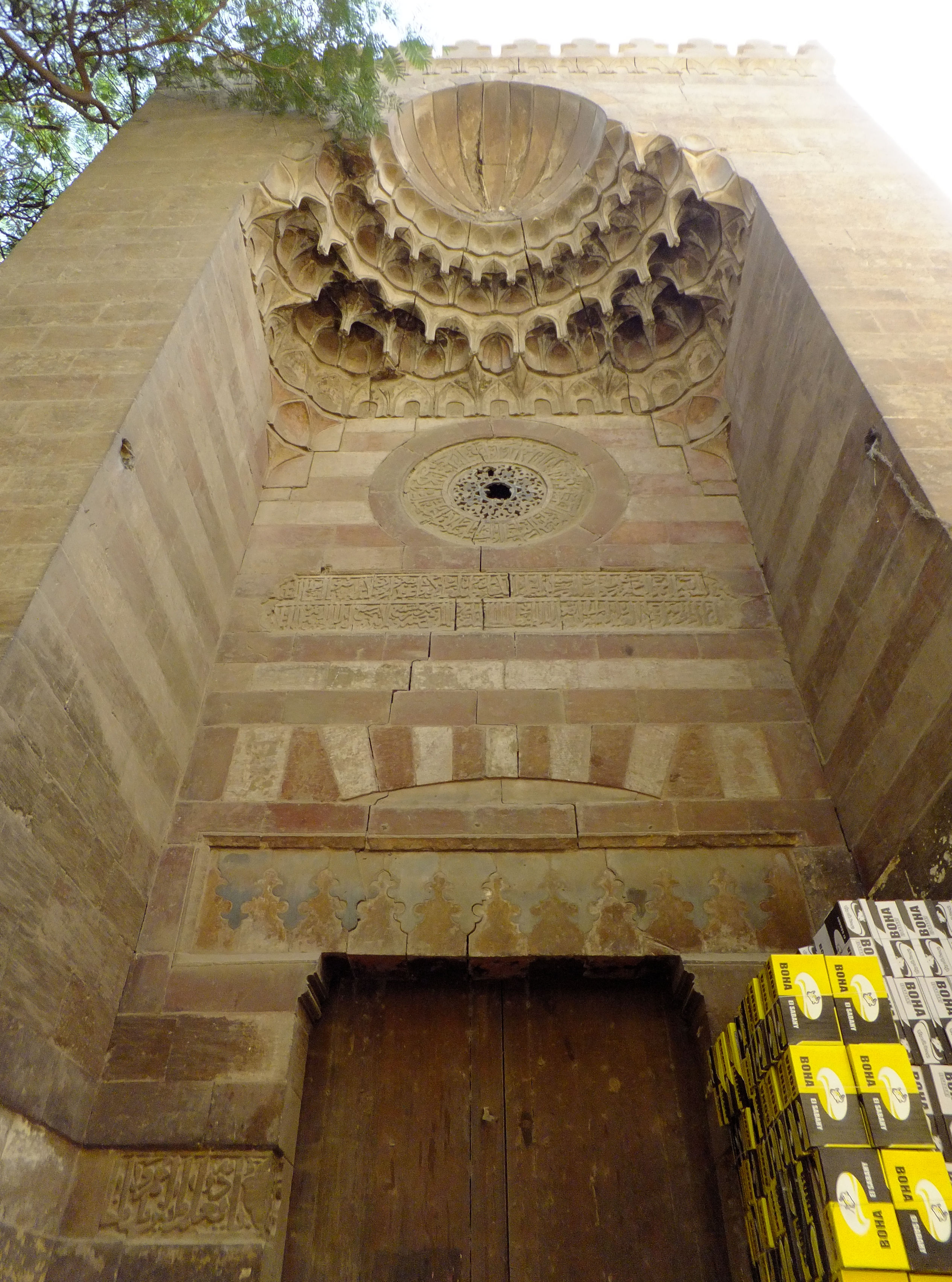
Northwestern entrance of the mosque (opposite the qibla)

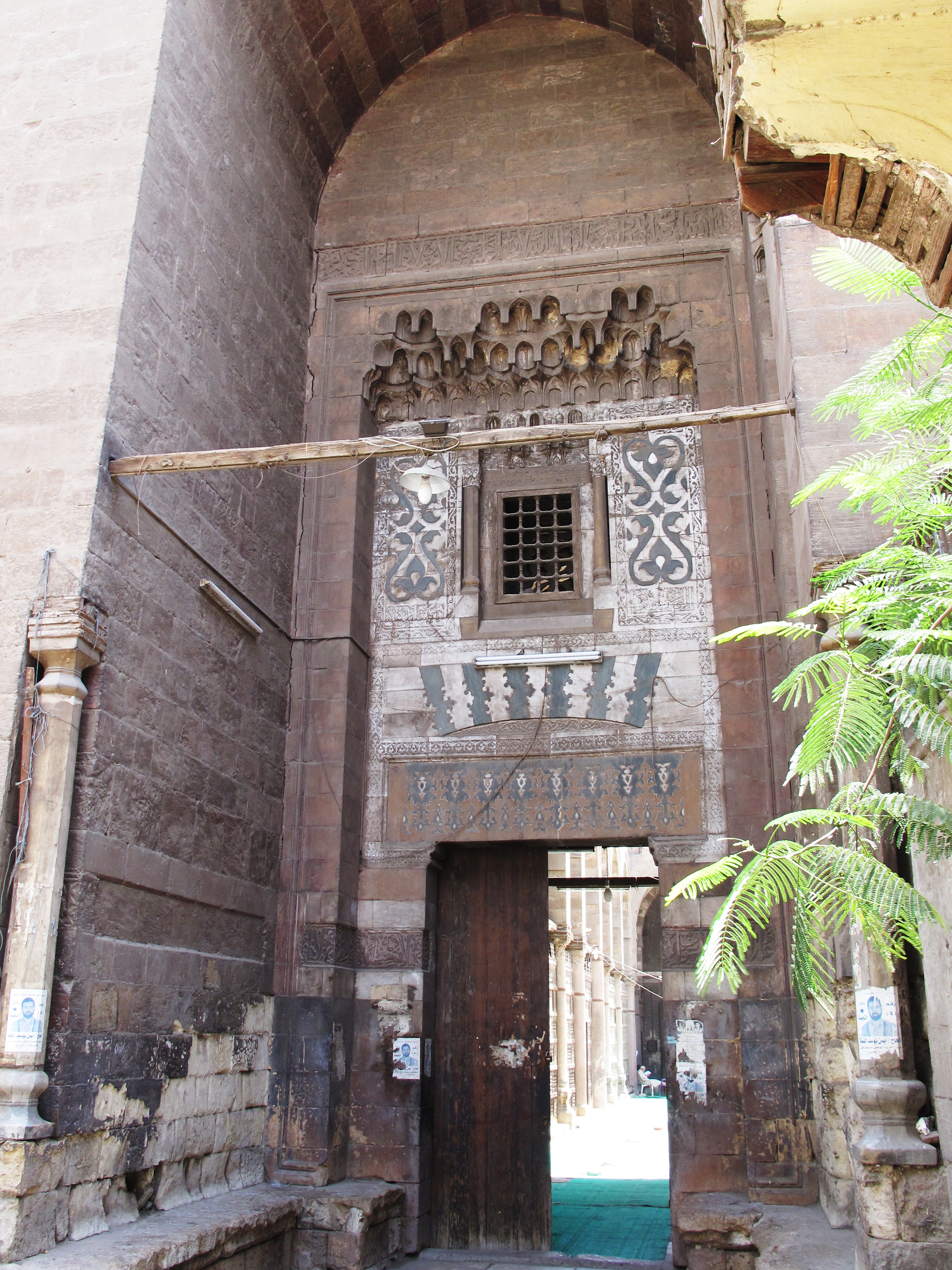
Northeastern entrance portal of the mosque

The exterior of Amir al-Maridani's mosque is typical for an urban Mamluk mosque, characterized by "recesses crowned with muqarnas including double-arched windows". The mosque has three entrances, with the west entrance on the same axis as that of the prayer niche and the main entrance on the north side of the mosque; each has the shape of an iwan with a pointed arch and is topped by a medallion of faience mosaics. The main entrance is a deep recess, crowned by a muqarnas cresting, panelled with marble and richly patterned. The joggled door lintels and the small window framed by colonettes are both common features in Mamluk architecture. In this case, the small outer window corresponds to an inner window with a blue-and-white tile grille. The date of completion appears on the main entrance's crown, and again on the west entrance and in the prayer hall. The west entrance is decorated differently, with a sunrise motif decorating muqarnas pendentives in the ablaq technique of alternating light and dark stone courses. Between the pendentives, a medallion with a smaller medallion in its center is decorated with tile mosaics. The south entrance is entirely undecorated. Decorative tile usage is also found at the Mosque of al-Nasir Muhammad.

The façade of the main wall, which corresponds to the interior mihrab wall, is panelled with recessed windows. The lower windows are rectangular while the upper are double arched with single arched qamariyyas, multi-colored stained glass windows, mirroring them on the interior. The northern, eastern and part of the southern facades are the only ones with these windows, as they would have lined the busiest streets and as such been the most visible walls. The remaining wall sections, around the west and south entrances, are plain and windowless. The main wall is buttressed by the mihrab, as it protrudes slightly into an otherwise thin outer wall.

==== Minaret ====
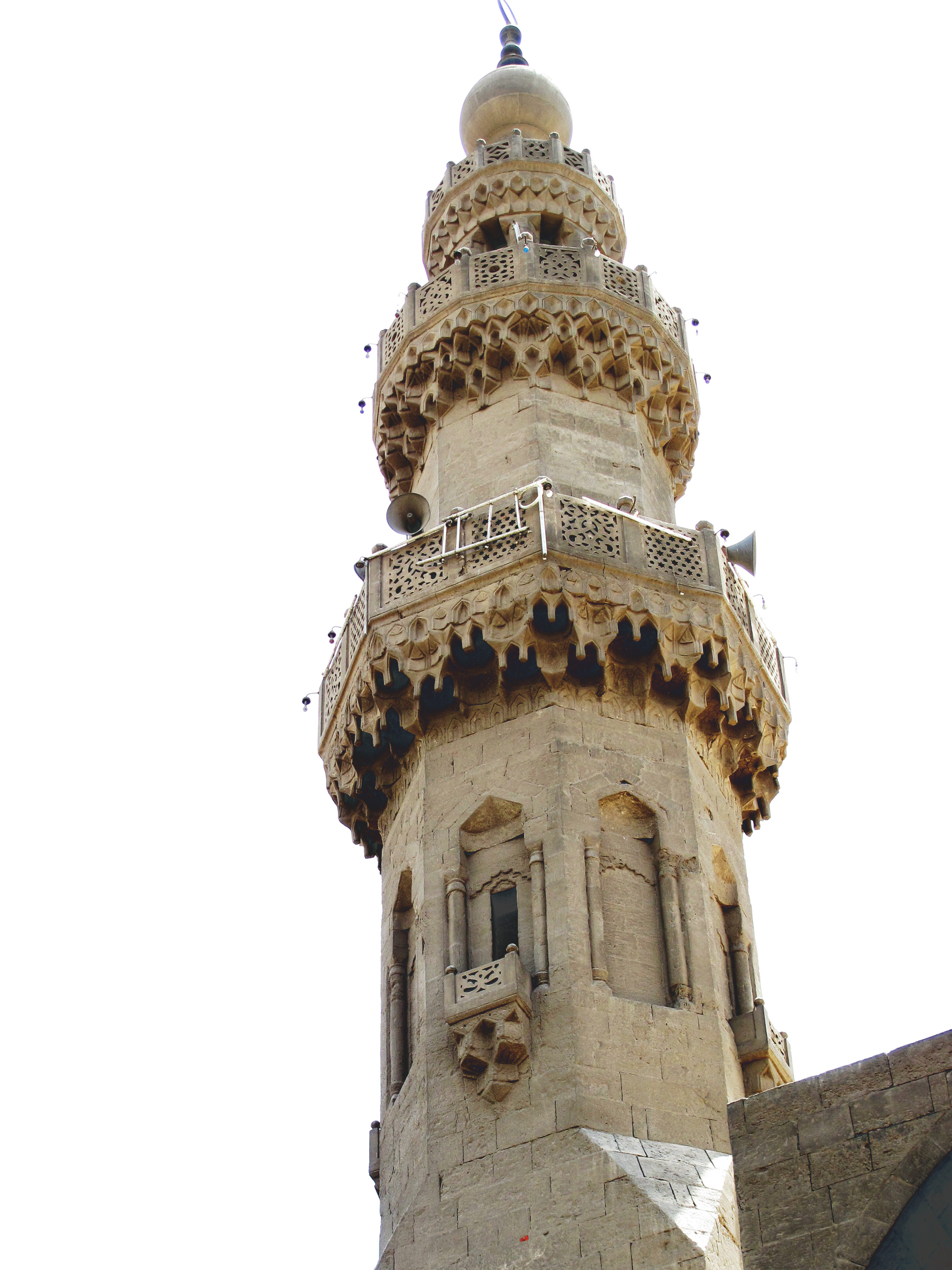
The minaret has an octagonal shaft, muqarnas corbelling for the balconies, and a bulbous stone finial on top.

Located just to the left of the main entrance, the minaret is the earliest known example of entirely octagonal shaft. It is also the earliest minaret crowned with a top that is not the mabkhara type. Instead, the pear-shaped bulb sits on top of the eight-columned pavilion crowned with muqarnas; it is replicated on the interior wooden pulpit. On the wall beneath the minaret, the golden band that runs from the main entrance along the entire facade breaks, and the corner nearest the mosque is missing its colonettes. The buttress of the minaret is also built with different stone than the rest of the mosque, indicating that this section of the wall was rebuilt. The top of the minaret is similar to the top of the minaret at the Mosque of Bashtak.

=== Interior ===
As is the case with many Mamluk era hypostyle mosques, the Mosque of Amir al-Maridani is supported by columns from earlier buildings. In this case, the granite columns were taken from the Fatimid mosque of Rashida, though they were originally taken from ancient monuments. Many of the columns have varying heights which is compensated for with different sized pedestals. The eight columns that support the dome, however, are all of equal size, have ancient Egyptian capitals, and were likely brought from Upper Egypt.

The Mosque of Sitt Hadaq also has recessed panels with windows appearing on only three of the four facades.

==== Courtyard ====
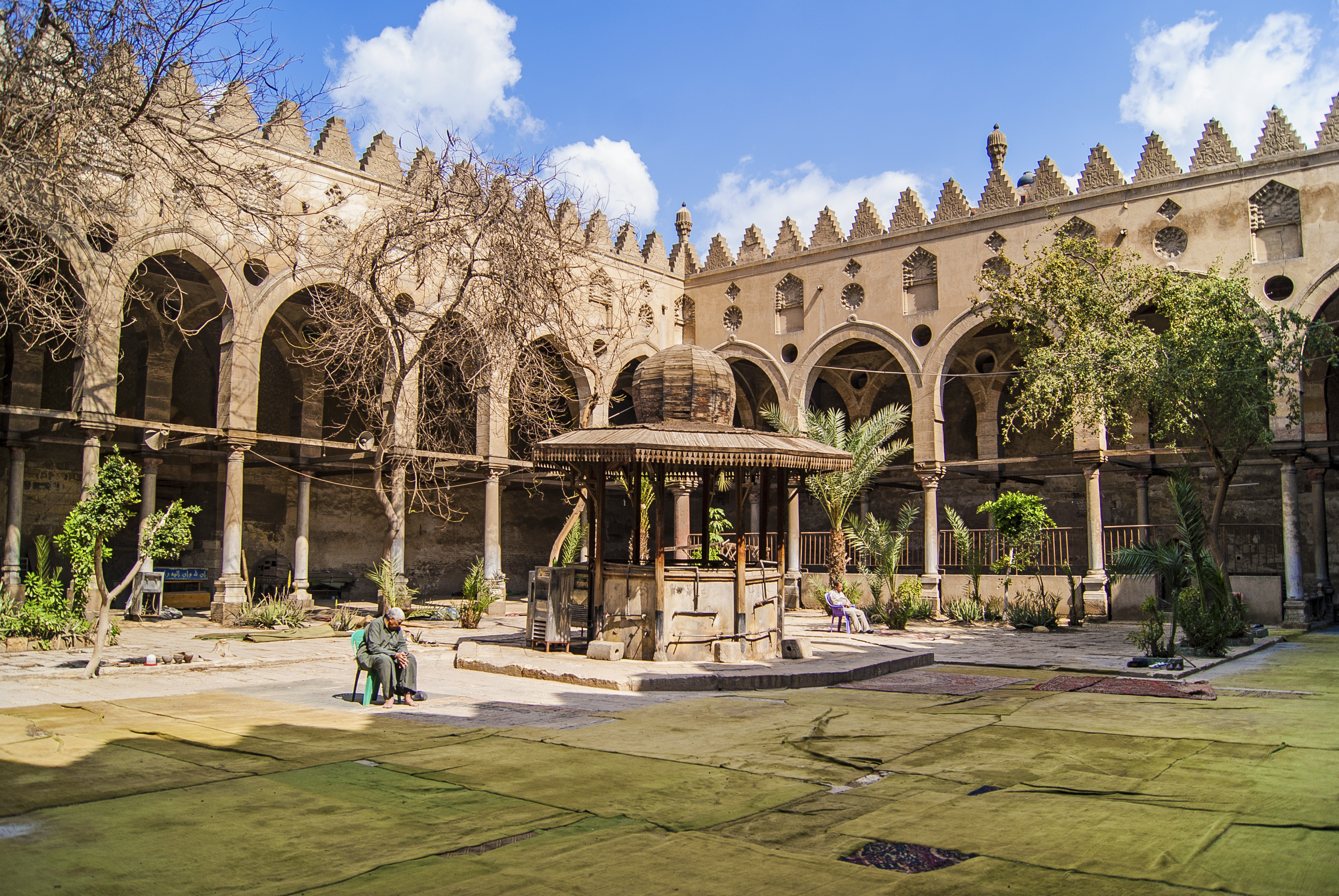
The sahn (courtyard)

The facade of the courtyard (sahn), created by the surrounding arcades, is characterized by features that are unusual for Mamluk architecture. The points of the arches are framed with a continuous molding that curls into a loop at the top of each arch, and stucco carved niches and medallions alternate in the spandrels of each arcade. Crenellation crowns the arches, and is also carved in stucco. Relieving oculi penetrate the spandrels of the second row of arches, and at each corner and at the middle of each façade of the courtyard a small mabkhara-shaped turret containing a bulb of blue glass. The fountain in the courtyard is not a part of the original mosque.

A mashrabiyya screen marks the separation between the sahn and the prayer hall

The courtyard area is separated from the prayer hall with a mashrabiyya, upon which is a large inscription from the Qur'an. This wooden screen mostly shades the prayer hall from the courtyard's light, making the double windows in the outer wall necessary. A similar mashrabiyya is found at Qalawun's mausoleum.

==== Prayer hall ====
The prayer hall is richly decorated, though the historic decoration suffered during the mosque's deterioration in modern times. The qibla (southeastern) wall is decorated with the remains of gilded stucco and epigraphic bands, with trees at their center. These trees are one of the only extant naturalistic features in Mamluk architectural decoration. The mihrab is made of polychrome marble and has friezes of small niches with blue-glass colonettes on the side framing its upper edge. The dado has similar friezes. The walls are decorated with marble mosaics centered by a Kufic inscription of Allah, and on the northern wall there is a panel made totally of white marble inlaid with green gypsum. Marble dados were also found in the sanctuaries of the mosques of al-Nasir Muhammad and al-Mu'ayyad. The minbar (pulpit) next to the mihrab is original and decorated with a geometric star pattern.

The dome, over the mihrab area, is slightly smaller than the dome of the Al-Nasir Muhammad Mosque and has similar gilded and painted wooden pendentives. The windows in the transitional zone between ceiling and dome are of one oculus over two bays, and are decorated with stucco arabesque grills filled with colored glass. A wooden dome over a mihrab is also found at the mosques of al-Zahir Baybars and al-Nasir Muhammad. Smaller wooden domes are above the mihrab area at the mosques of Zayn al-Din Yahya in Bulaq and Habbaniyya.

There is a small room occupying the southeast corner of the prayer hall, but its original function is unknown.

Elements and details of the prayer hall

The prayer hall, with the mihrab on the left (2026 photo, after recent restoration)

The mihrab (2026 photo)

Stucco decoration on the wall above the mihrab (2026 photo)

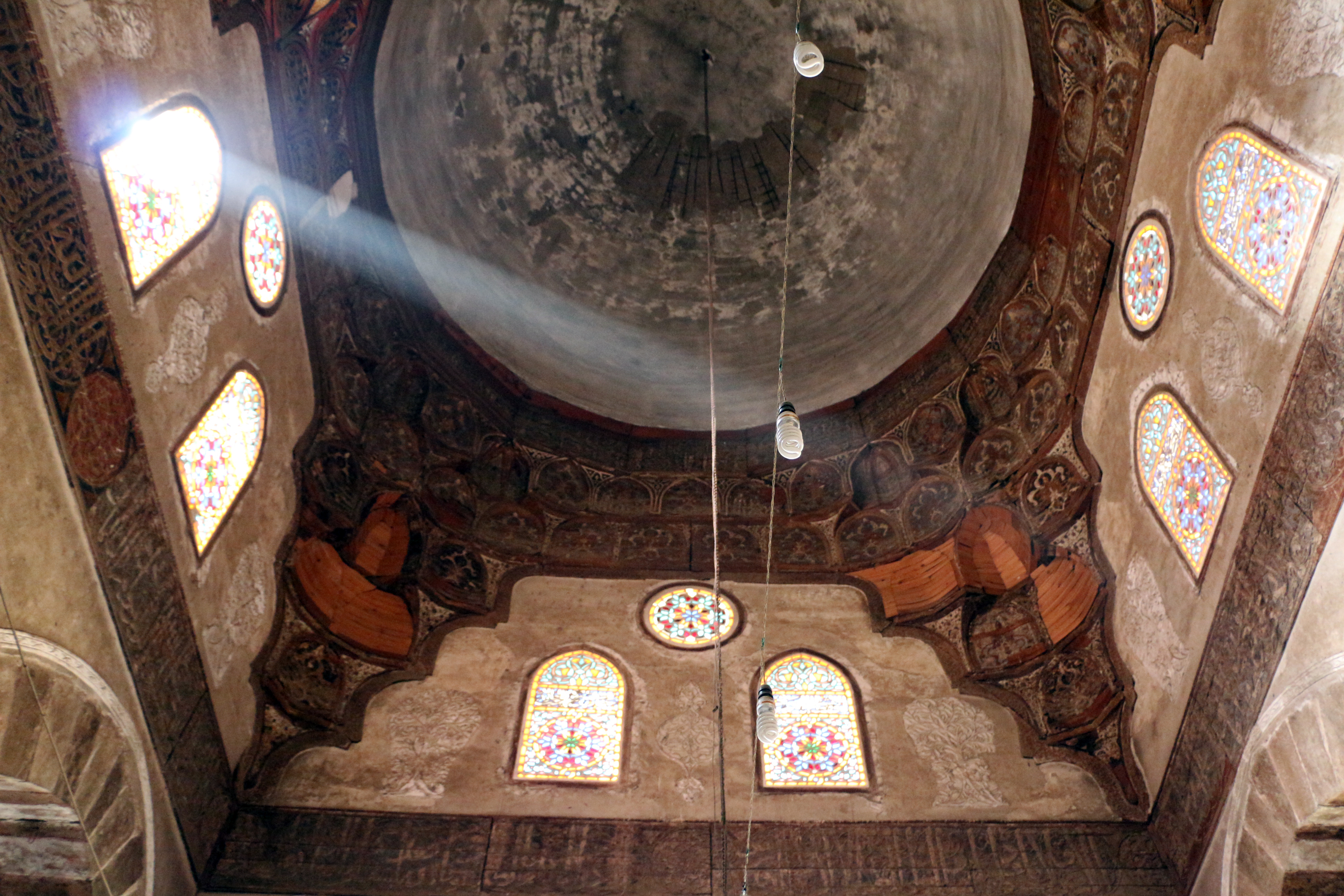
The dome in front of the mihrab (2015 photo, before recent restoration)

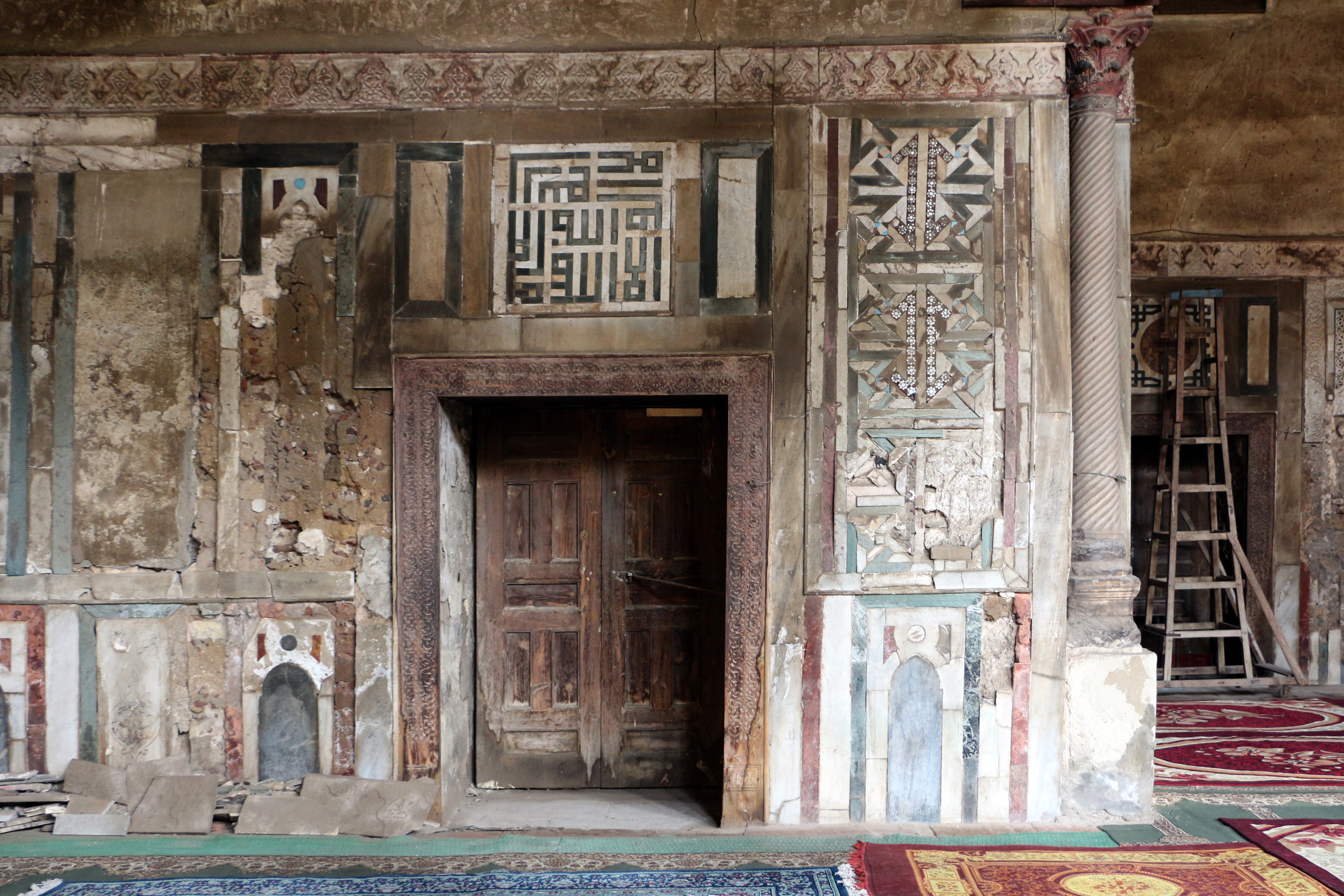
Marble decoration, including a panel of square Kufic above the door in the middle (2015 photo)

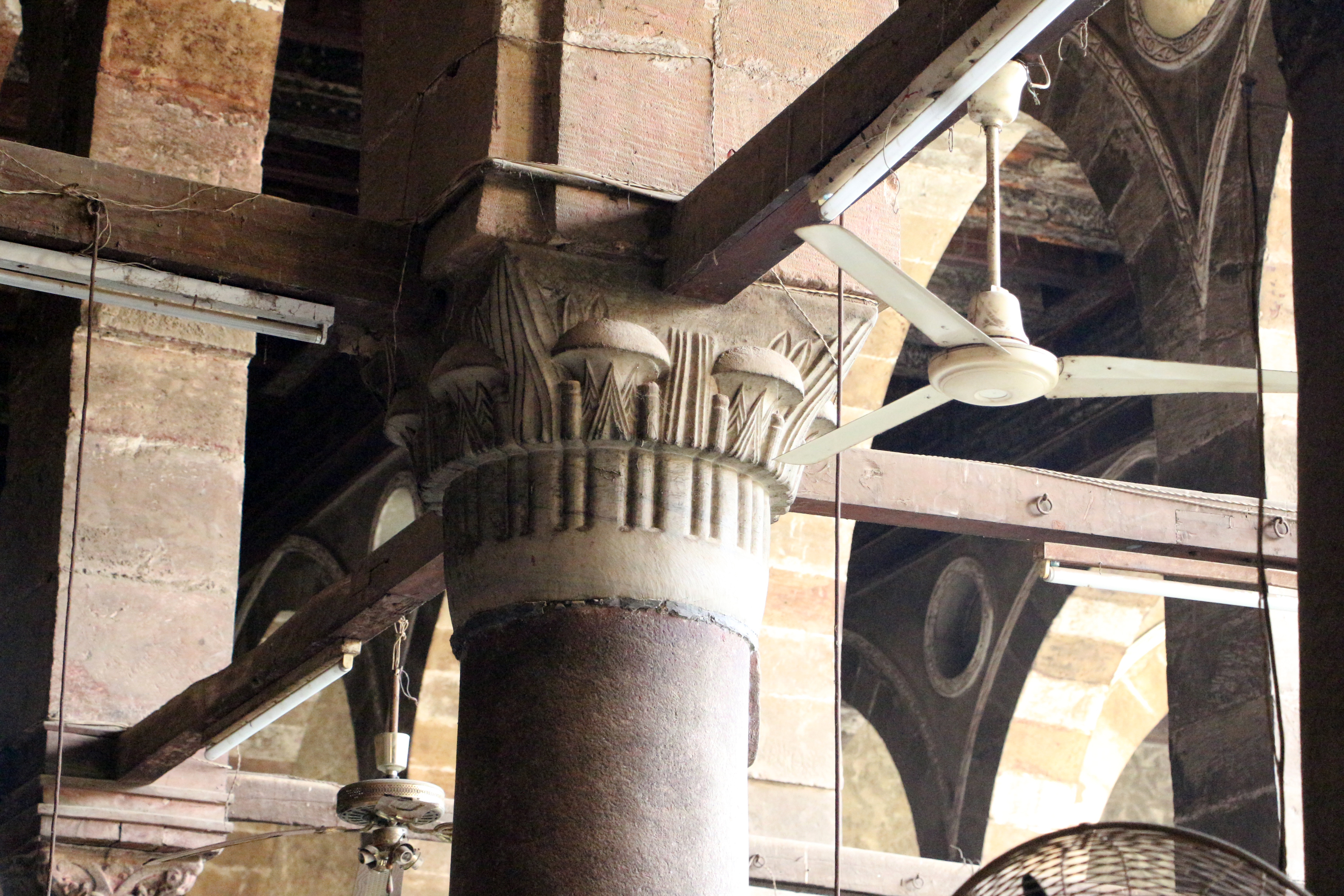
One of the re-used ancient columns and capitals

== See also ==
- Islam in Egypt
- List of mosques in Cairo
- Late medieval domes
