= Qutlubugha al-Fakhri =

Qutlubugha al-Fakhri (died May/June 1342) was a Mamluk emir during the reigns of sultans an-Nasir Muhammad (r. 1310–1341), al-Mansur Abu Bakr (r. 1341), al-Ashraf Kujuk (r. 1341–1342) and an-Nasir Ahmad (r. 1342). Qutlubugha had been purchased by an-Nasir Muhammad, who promoted him to the highest Mamluk military rank. He was demoted and exiled to Syria under the protection of Emir Tankiz in 1327 after an-Nasir Muhammad held him responsible for an incident which could have potentially caused a mutiny of Qutlubugha's mamluks against the sultan.

After an-Nasir Muhammad's death, Qutlubugha was commissioned by the strongman of Egypt, Emir Qawsun, to arrest their former master's son, an-Nasir Ahmad. After besieging the latter in al-Karak for twenty days, Qutlubugha defected to an-Nasir Ahmad. Thereafter, he and his closest ally, Emir Tashtamur Hummus Akhdar of Aleppo, launched a campaign to topple Qawsun and his puppet sultan, al-Ashraf Kujuk, and place an-Nasir Ahmad on the throne. They succeeded in January 1342, but their high-ranking positions in the new government was cut short when each was arrested on an-Nasir Ahmad's orders. The reason for Qutlubugha's arrest was unclear. It was likely related to an-Nasir Ahmad's resentment toward Qutlubugha for playing the key role in installing him as sultan and thus taking him away from his isolated stronghold of al-Karak, which he preferred to the Mamluk capital in Cairo. An-Nasir Ahmad brought Qutlubugha and Tashtamur to al-Karak when he moved the sultanate there in May 1342 and subsequently had them executed.

== Biography ==
=== Career under an-Nasir Muhammad ===
Qutlubugha was a mamluk of Sultan an-Nasir Muhammad. At the onset of his third reign (1310–1341), an-Nasir Muhammad made Qutlubugha and another of his mamluks, Tashtamur Hummus Akhdar, umara mi'a (emirs of one hundred mamluk horsemen). Qutlubugha and Tashtamur were favored by an-Nasir Muhammad because of their good looks. In the following years, Qutlubugha raised a powerful mamluk faction of his own.

In March 1327, Qutlubugha concocted a plot to oust a rival emir, Baktamur as-Saqi, by writing an anonymous note to an-Nasir Muhammad that stated Qutlubugha and Tashtamur were plotting to assassinate him and usurp the throne. Qutlubugha's plan was to provoke an-Nasir Muhammad to arrest him and Tashtamur and thereby cause an uproar and mutiny among their mamluks against the sultan. In Qutlubugha's estimation, his mamluks and those of Tashtamur would, in their outrage, blame Baktamur as the anonymous author of the note with the motive of bringing about Qutlubugha's downfall. This would in turn persuade an-Nasir Muhammad to exonerate Qutlubugha and depose Baktamur. Qutlubugha's plan initially succeeded, with his mamluks going on a hunger strike and threatening a mutiny should Qutlubugha and Tashtamur remain incarcerated. An-Nasir Muhammad was compelled to bow to their demands for fear of a mamluk mutiny in the Cairo Citadel, headquarters of the sultanate. Emir Tankiz al-Husami, the viceroy of Syria, mediated on Qutlubugha's behalf and negotiated an end to the standoff with an-Nasir Muhammad, who ultimately agreed to send Qutlubugha to Damascus with Tankiz. However, after the issue was settled, an-Nasir Muhammad discovered that Qutlubugha was responsible for the incident and had him demoted, a relatively light penalty.

=== Conflict with Qawsun ===
An-Nasir Muhammad died in 1341 and was succeeded by his son al-Mansur Abu Bakr, although real power was held by Emir Qawsun, who toppled al-Mansur Abu Bakr two months into his reign and appointed a figurehead sultan in his place, al-Ashraf Kujuk. Qawsun's supremacy was challenged by another of an-Nasir Muhammad's sons, an-Nasir Ahmad of al-Karak, who had the support of a number of Syrian Mamluk emirs, most prominently Tashtamur. On 7 October 1341, Qawsun dispatched Qutlubugha and a Mamluk army from Egypt to subdue al-Karak and force an-Nasir Ahmad's surrender. However, twenty days into his siege of al-Karak, Qutlubugha defected to an-Nasir Ahmad. Prior to the siege, Qutlubugha had been asked by Tashtamur, his close ally, to join an-Nasir Ahmad out of loyalty to their former master, an-Nasir Muhammad. After his defection to an-Nasir Ahmad, Qutlubugha sent a letter to Qawsun warning him to stand down in favor of an-Nasir Ahmad, writing "And you are alone with this band [of mamluks] and they will be of no assistance to you in the hour of need, they will desert you and join us".

Qawsun's loyalists in Syria consisted of the nuwwab (governors) of Tripoli, Homs and Safad and were led by the na'ib (governor) of Damascus, Altunbugha as-Salihi. Once Altunbugha's forces embarked on an offensive against Tashtamur in Aleppo, Qutlubugha took advantage of Altunbugha's absence to occupy Damascus in November. Qutlubugha secured the defection of Altunbugha's mamluks who had stayed in Damascus and proclaimed an-Nasir Ahmad sultan. He thereafter began establishing a loyalist administration in the city. A part of Qutlubugha's tactics to gain funds for his efforts were viewed condemned by the city's Muslim scholarly establishment. Among these tactics were the collection of taxes before they were due, confiscating money from orphanages and extortion of well-to-do merchants.

In anticipation of Altunbugha's return to Damascus, Qutlubugha and his forces posted at Khan Lajin, a caravanserai north of the city, that Altunbugha would have to pass through in order to reach Damascus. As Altunbugha's army, which was about six times larger than Qutlubugha's force, approached Khan Lajin, the vast majority of the mamluks, emirs and Bedouin sheikhs in his coalition defected to Qutlubugha, who had apparently bribed them beforehand. Altunbugha escaped to Cairo. Qutlubugha reentered Damascus in triumph to celebrations in the streets and a formal proclamation of an-Nasir Ahmad's accession in the Friday prayer sermons. An-Nasir Ahmad granted Qutlubugha major powers, including the ability to appoint or confirm nuwwab in Syria, and appointed him na'ib as-saltana ash-Sham (viceroy of Syria). In December, Qawsun was ousted and arrested and in January 1342, al-Ashraf Kujuk was deposed and officially succeeded by an-Nasir Ahmad.

=== Downfall under an-Nasir Ahmad ===
An-Nasir Ahmad's plans to enter Damascus in a royal procession from there to Cairo alongside Qutlubugha were changed to a more low-key procession from Gaza. However, when Qutlubugha reached Gaza, an-Nasir Ahmad neglected to appear, remaining in his stronghold of al-Karak, to Qutlubugha's confusion and disappointment. Eventually, an-Nasir Ahmad departed for Cairo on his own, to Qutlubugha's deep chagrin.

An-Nasir Ahmad was a seclusive ruler who rarely communicated directly with the senior Mamluk emirs, relying instead on his retinue of supporters from al-Karak as intermediaries. As a result of complaints from the emirs against Tashtamur alleging that the latter issued orders without authorization from an-Nasir Ahmad, among other offenses, an-Nasir Ahmad had Tashtamur, Qutlubugha's principal ally, arrested in May 1342. Afterward, rival emirs sought to arrest Qutlubugha, who was still na'ib of Damascus. The latter had been on his way to Baysan in Palestine and thus an-Nasir Ahmad directed the governor of Gaza, a city en route to Baysan, to intercept Qutlubugha. The latter became aware of the arrest order against him while he was in Salihiyya in the Nile Delta. He managed to avoid arrest as he traveled eastward along the Mediterranean coast through Sinai and Palestine, but he had to stop at Jenin to seek shelter with the na'ib of Aleppo, Emir Aydughmish, who was temporarily camping in the area. The two went to the Aydughmish's encampment at Ain Jalut where they were joined by Emir Baybars al-Ahmadi, the na'ib of Safad. Although Aydughmish had feigned sympathy with Qutlubugha's situation, he ultimately arrested him and had him transferred.

The reasons for Qutlubugha's arrest are unclear because he had remained loyal to an-Nasir Ahmad and did not provoke the senior emirs like Tashtamur did. According to historian Joseph Drory, an-Nasir Ahmad probably resentful of Qutlubugha for being the main party responsible, along with Tashtamur, for bringing him out of his isolated stronghold of al-Karak, where he was comfortable, to assume the sultanate in Cairo, a duty which an-Nasir Ahmad had been hesitant to assume since the struggle with Qawsun. By the time of Qutlubugha's arrest, an-Nasir Ahmad was making preparation to return to al-Karak, from which he intended to reign instead of the Mamluk capital in Cairo. As an-Nasir Ahmad crossed into Palestine, Qutlubugha was transferred to his custody and accompanied him to al-Karak. An-Nasir Ahmad left Emir Aqsunqur as-Salari in charge in Egypt on his behalf and directed to confiscate the assets of Qutlubugha and Tashtamur, who was also brought to al-Karak. Sometime in May or June 1342, an-Nasir Ahmad had Qutlubugha and Tashtamur executed in al-Karak, an act which appalled the Mamluk public, which viewed the execution of two ardent loyalists as a sign of an-Nasir Ahmad's deep ingratitude. An-Nasir Ahmad was deposed later in June by his half-brother as-Salih Isma'il, whose forces ultimately arrested an-Nasir Ahmad in 1344 after eight sieges against al-Karak, and subsequently executed him.

== Bibliography ==
- Drory, Joseph (2006). "The Prince who Favored the Desert: Fragmentary Biography of al-Nasir Ahmad (d. 745/1344)". In Wasserstein, David J.; Ayalon, Ami (eds.). Mamluks and Ottomans: Studies in Honour of Michael Winter. Routledge. ISBN 9781136579172.
- Levanoni, Amalia (1995). A Turning Point in Mamluk History: The Third Reign of Al-Nāṣir Muḥammad Ibn Qalāwūn (1310-1341). Brill. ISBN 9789004101821.

Regnal titles
Preceded by An-Nasir Muhammad	Mamluk Sultan; June 1341–August 1341	Succeeded by Al-Ashraf Kujuk
