= Al-Kamil Sha'ban =

Sha'ban
- Al-Malik al-Kamil
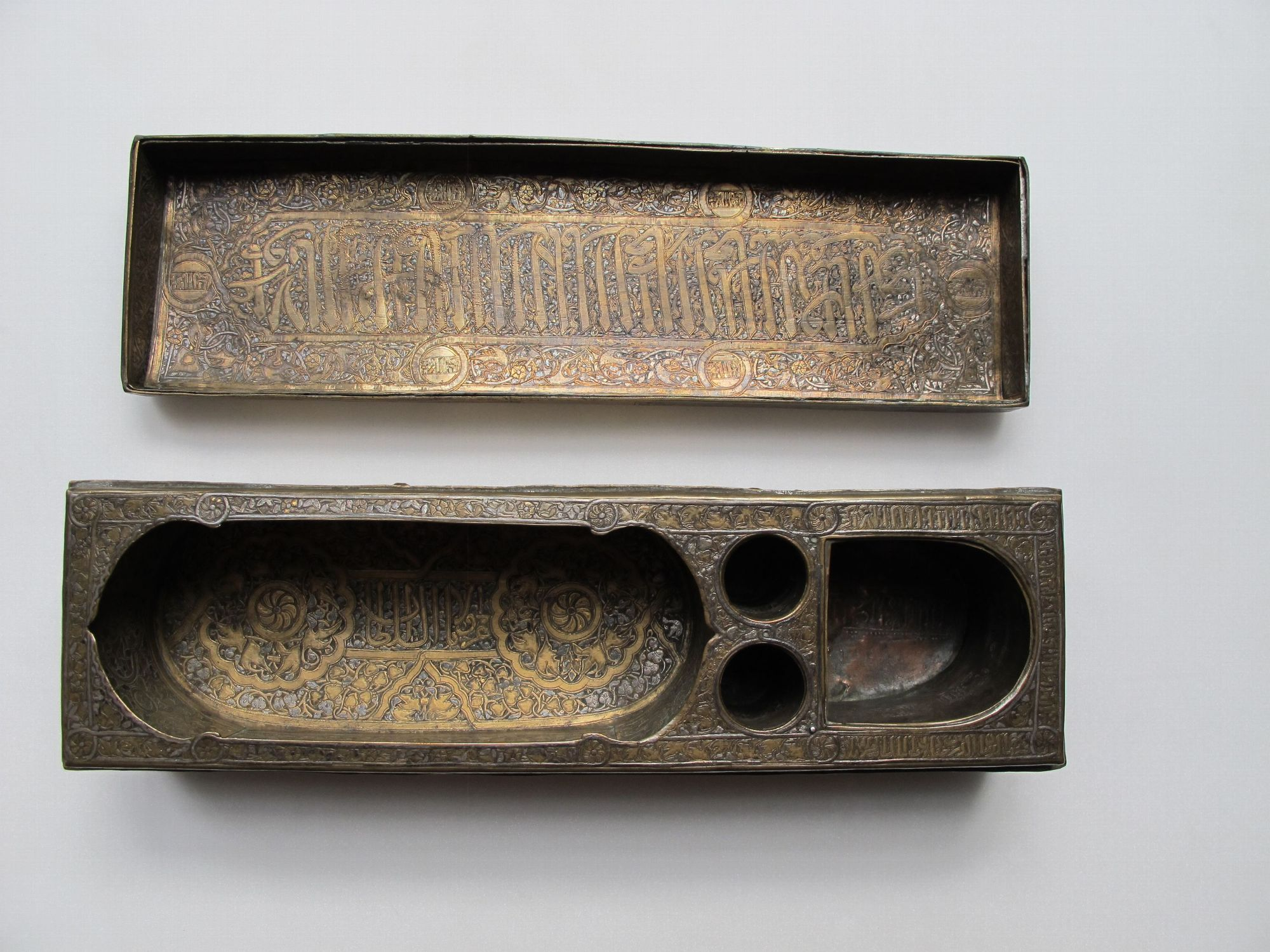
- Writing utensils for Al-Kamil Sha'ban

Sultan of Egypt
- Reign: August 1345 – September 1346
- Predecessor: Al-Salih Ismail
- Successor: Al-Muzaffar Hajji
- Born: unknown Cairo, Mamluk Sultanate
- Died: 21 September 1346; Cairo, Mamluk Sultanate
Names
- Al-Malik al-Kamil Sayf ad-Din Sha'ban ibn Muhammad
- House: Qalawuni
- Dynasty: Bahri
- Father: Al-Nasir Muhammad
- Religion: Islam

Al-Kamil Sayf ad-Din Sha'ban ibn Muhammad ibn Qalawun, better known as al-Kamil Sha'ban, was the Mamluk sultan of Egypt between August 1345 and January 1346. He was the fifth son of al-Nasir Muhammad to serve as sultan, having succeeded his brother al-Salih Ismail. Sha'ban was toppled and killed during a revolt against his rule organized by Emir Shams ad-Din Aqsunqur on behalf of his brother al-Muzaffar Hajji.

== Biography ==
Sha'ban was a son of the long-reigning and autocratic Mamluk sultan al-Nasir Muhammad and one of his concubines, whose name is not provided by the Mamluk-era sources. When al-Nasir Muhammad died, several of his sons succeeded him as sultan, with Abu Bakr, Kujuk, al-Nasir Ahmad and al-Salih Ismail assuming the post in succession, although many of them held power in name only; influential Mamluk emirs often held real power. In August 1345, Sha'ban's full brother al-Salih Ismail died from an illness, and was succeeded by Sha'ban, thenceforth known as al-Kamil Sha'ban.

Sha'ban made a pact with the leading Mamluk emirs, chief among them Arghum al-Ala'i, his stepfather. Despite the pacts he made with the leading emirs, Sha'ban alienated them relatively quickly, along with the Mamluk governors of Syria and the officers of his personal guard. Consequently, a revolt against his rule occurred in September 1346. The revolt was organized by the Mamluk emir Shams ad-Din Aqsunqur on behalf of Sha'ban's brother al-Muzaffar Hajji. Sha'ban was subsequently captured and executed on 21 September 1346, while Arghum was imprisoned in Alexandria and died there. Sha'ban was buried alongside Yusuf ibn Muhammad, one of his brothers. Before he died Sha'ban had a son who died in infancy and a daughter named A'isha, who married a certain Emir Rajab.

The Mamluk-era historian Ibn Taghribirdi described Sha'ban as "one of the worst rulers as far as injustice and immorality were concerned. During his days the country was ruined because of his passion for entertainment and adherence to the drinking places and fondness for singers."

== Bibliography ==
- Holt, Peter Malcolm (1986). The Age of the Crusades: The Near East from the Eleventh Century to 151. Addison Wesley Longman Limited. ISBN 9781317871521.
- Holt, Peter Malcolm (1998). "Literary Offerings: A Genre of Courtly Literature". In Philipp, Thomas; Haarmann, Ulrich (eds.). The Mamluks in Egyptian Politics and Society. Cambridge University Press. ISBN 9780521591157.
- Lewicka, Paulina (2011). Food and Foodways of Medieval Cairenes: Aspects of Life in an Islamic Metropolis of the Eastern Mediterranean. Brill. ISBN 9789004194724.
- Williams, Caroline (2008). Islamic Monuments in Cairo: The Practical Guide. American University in Cairo Press. ISBN 9789774162053.

Regnal titles
Preceded by As-Salih Ismail	Mamluk Sultan; August 1345–September 1346	Succeeded by Al-Muzaffar Hajji
