= Al-Qaysarani =

Al-Qaysarānī or Ibn al-Qaysarānī may refer to:

- Ibn Tahir (Abu al-Fadl Muhammad ibn Tahir ibn Ali al-Qaysarani, 1058–1113)
- Abū ʿAbdallāh Muḥammad ibn Naṣr ibn al-Qaysarānī (1085–1154)
- Abū Muḥammad ʿAbd al-Salām ibn al-Ḥasan ibn al-Ṭuwayr al-Qaysarānī (1130–1220)
- Ibrahim ibn Abd al-Rahman ibn al-Qaysarani (died 1352)
