= As-Salih Ismail =

As-Salih Ismail may refer to:

- As-Salih Ismail, Emir of Damascus, the Ayyubid ruler of Damascus in the mid-13th century
- As-Salih Ismail, Sultan of Egypt, the Mamluk sultan of Egypt between 1342 and 1345
- As-Salih Ismail al-Malik, a Zengid ruler in the 13th century
