= Baligh ibn Yusuf ibn Tayyi =

Baligh ibn Yusuf ibn Tayyi (/ALA-LC: Bāligh ibn Yūsuf ibn Ṭayyiʾ) was the Arab commander (muqaddam) of the halqa (non-mamluk) regiment of the fortress of al-Karak in the mid-14th century under the Mamluks. He was a key backer of Sultan an-Nasir Ahmad (r. 1342) during the latter's brief reign. However, he ultimately betrayed an-Nasir Ahmad after being recruited by the latter's brother and usurper of the throne, as-Salih Ismail in 1344.

== Biography ==
Baligh is rarely mentioned in Mamluk chronicles. His surname "Tayyi" indicates that he was a member of the Tayyid tribe of Banu Rabi'ah, though it is not known if he belonged to the Al Fadl or Al Mira branch. While the Banu Rabi'ah was the most dominant tribe in Mamluk Syria, the area around al-Karak was dominated by the Banu Uqba. During the power struggle following the death of Sultan an-Nasir Muhammad (r. 1310–1341), Baligh was one of the main backers of the sultan's al-Karak-based son, an-Nasir Ahmad. The Mamluk historian al-Maqrizi wrote that Baligh was Ahmad's "most important confidant among the people of al-Karak", whose Arab inhabitants were a well-spring of support for Ahmad. Ahmad eventually gained the sultanate and moved the Mamluk throne from Cairo to al-Karak. Baligh officially served as the muqaddam (commander) of the halqa (non-mamluk) regiment in al-Karak's fortress. The regiment consisted of Bedouin tribesmen and locals from the al-Sharat mountains.

While Ahmad ruled from al-Karak, the Mamluks in Egypt had him replaced with his half-brother, as-Salih Ismail. Hoping to be rewarded for his loyalty, Baligh continued to support Ahmad during the numerous Mamluk campaigns against al-Karak. On 30 August 1343, Baligh was wounded in the leg during one of the Mamluk expeditions against Ahmad. However, as Ahmad's "wealth came to depletion", Baligh "began to work upon him", according to al-Maqrizi. Baligh began communications with Ismail via the Mamluk emirs besieging al-Karak. The latter could not be captured because of the resistance of Baligh's Arab troops throughout the vicinity. Baligh promised Ismail he could arrange the surrender of al-Karak, writing

All the people in the fortress of al-Karak are my friends and those in the city are my family and kinsfolk. No one among them contradicts me.

Ismail accepted Baligh's offer, giving him a pardon, after which Baligh escaped al-Karak to meet Ismail in Cairo. He arrived with a coterie of supporters on 21 March 1344, and in return for his defection, was granted an iqta (fief) with an annual revenue of 450,000 silver dirhams and the title of amir tablkhana. Baligh left Cairo three days later and proceeded to facilitate the surrender of al-Karak and Ahmad to Ismail's troops on 5 July 1344. In August, Baligh and a certain Isa ibn Hasan were arrested on charges of involvement in the murder of a camel merchant in Cairo named Hasan ibn al-Radini. The na'ib of Cairo sought to punish them by bastinado, but they managed to have the punishment delayed pending further investigation. Afterward, they used their influence with some Mamluk emirs, who successfully lobbied for their release. This was the final time Baligh was mentioned in Mamluk sources.

== Bibliography ==
- Bauden, Frederic (2004). "The Recovery of Mamluk Chancery Documents in an Unsuspected Place". In Winter, Michael; Levanoni, Amalia (eds.). The Mamluks in Egyptian and Syrian Politics and Society. Leiden: Brill. ISBN 9004132864.
- Milwright, Marcus (2008). The Fortress of the Raven: Karak in the Middle Islamic Period (1100-1650). Brill. ISBN 9789047432906.
