= Qawsun =

Sayf ad-Din Qawsun
- سيف الدين قوصون
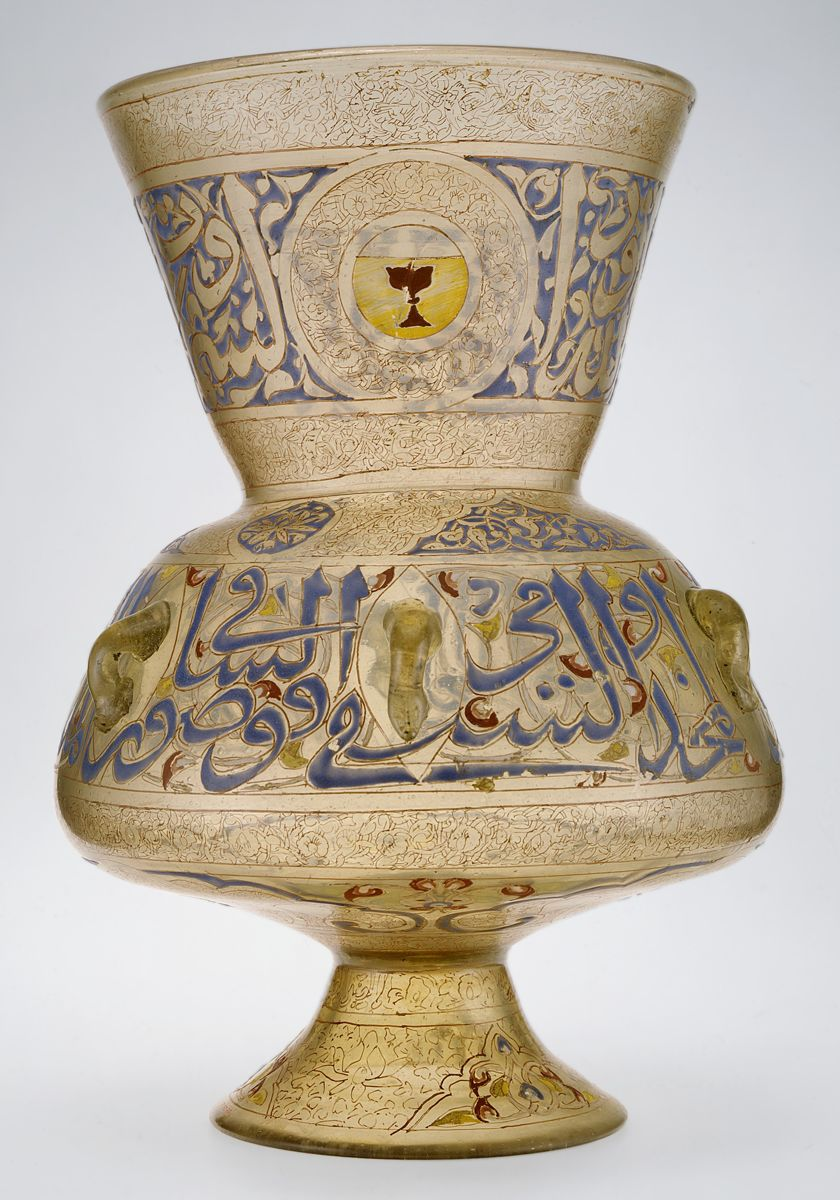
- Enamelled glass mosque lamp of Amir Qawsun, probably intended for one of his two architectural commissions in Cairo —the mosque or a tomb-hospice complex. Metropolitan Museum of Art

Emir of Mamluk Sultanate
- In office 1330s – 7 June 1341
- Monarch: an-Nasir Muhammad
- In office 7 June 1341 – 5 August 1341
- Monarch: al-Mansur Abu Bakr

Regent of Mamluk Saltanat
- In office 5 August 1341 – 21 January 1342
- Monarch: al-Ashraf Kujuk

Personal details
- Born: 1302
- Died: April 1342 (aged 39–40) Alexandria, Mamluk Egypt

Sayf ad-Din Qawsun ibn Abdullah an-Nasiri as-Saqi (1302 – April 1342), commonly known as Qawsun (also spelled Qausun or Qusun) was a prominent Mamluk emir during the reigns of sultans an-Nasir Muhammad (r. 1310–41), al-Mansur Abu Bakr (r. 1341) and al-Ashraf Kujuk (r. 1341–42).

== Origin ==
An ethnic Mongol, Qawsun was born in 1302, in the Kipchak steppe north of the Black Sea during the region's rule by the Golden Horde, a Mongol empire. An alternative location of his birthplace was the village of Barqa, near Bukhara. In his early career he was a merchant. In 1320, he joined an Egypt-bound naval caravan of 2,400 people, possibly led by his brother Tughay. The caravan was carrying Tulunbay, the daughter of the Golden Horde's emperor at the time, Özbeg Khan, who was heading to Egypt to marry Sultan an-Nasir Muhammad. The caravan arrived by sea to Alexandria on 5 May 1320. Qawsun had joined Tulunbay's retinue as a traveling merchant, and once he arrived in Egypt, he moved to the Mamluk Sultanate's capital, Cairo, to sell his leather wares.

== Senior emir of an-Nasir Muhammad ==
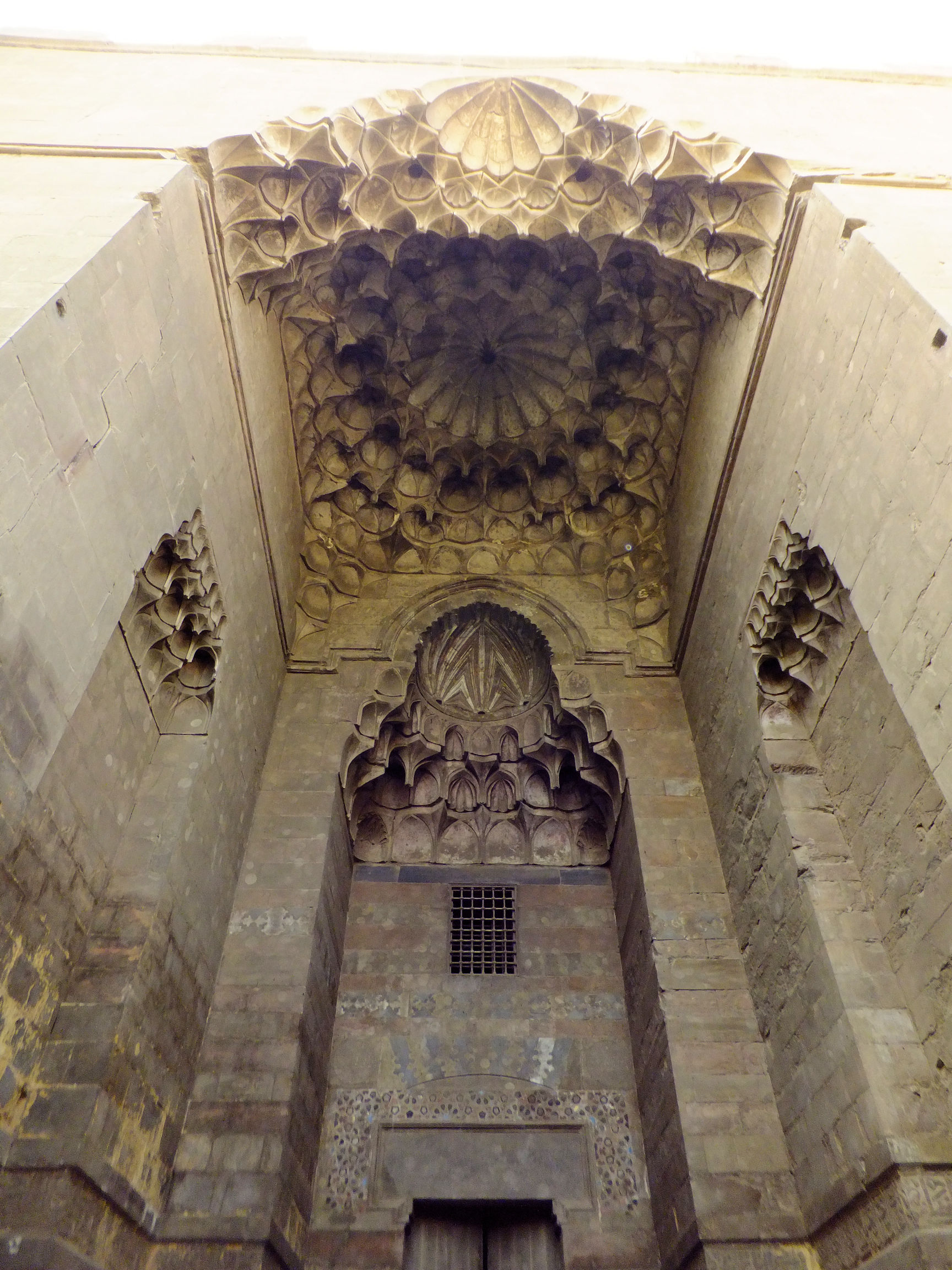
The monumental entrance portal of the Palace of Qawsun, built in the 1330s near Cairo's Citadel, and semi-ruined today.

In the course of his leather goods trade, Qawsun encountered one of an-Nasir Muhammad's imperial horse groomers, which ultimately led to an unplanned encounter with an-Nasir Muhammad. The latter was impressed by Qawsun's physical appearance (Qawsun was described as tall, handsome and youthful by Mamluk-era sources) and inquired about him. After Qawsun informed an-Nasir Muhammad that he was only in Egypt for travel, an-Nasir Muhammad insisted that he remain and enter his service, offering to invite Qawsun's family to immigrate to Egypt. Qawsun agreed and sold himself to an-Nasir Muhammad, thus becoming a mamluk. The latter act was key to entry into the Mamluk hierarchy and to develop good standing with the Mamluk elite. Qawsun was made part of the sultan's saqut (royal cup-bearers) and his 40-strong khassakiya (personal retinue), whose members held prominent positions in the sultanate. By 1323, he had grown powerful enough to have the naqib al-jaysh, Emir Sunqur al-Sa'di, exiled to Tripoli because he angered Qawsun.

Qawsun's adulthood, his bypassing of the rigorous mamluk training and education process and his lack of military service were an exception to the standard practice of mamluk promotion set by earlier Mamluk sultans. Responsibility for Qawsun's military training was handed to an-Nasir Muhammad's favorite emir at the time, Baktamur as-Saqi. In relatively quick succession, Qawsun was promoted to the rank of amir ashara, amir arba'in and in May 1326 the highest rank of amir mi'a muqaddam alf. The latter rank was held by 24 select emirs in the sultanate. Concurrent with his promotion, Qawsun was transferred the iqta (fief) of Emir Taynal, which, unprecedentedly was added to his older iqta. That year, an-Nasir Muhammad also gave Qawsun his daughter's hand in marriage, while an-Nasir Muhammad married Qawsun's sister. Qawsun often boasted of his circumstances, stating

I was bought by the sultan and became one of those closest to him; he made me amir, awarded me commander of one thousand and gave me the hand of his daughter, while others went from the traders directly to the military schools.

Qawsun's status among the emirs was unique at the time because he was allowed to publicly demonstrate his status; he would often ride in Cairo backed by two columns of 300 horsemen and was accompanied by up to one-third of the Mamluk army on his hunting expeditions. While an-Nasir Muhammad favored Qawsun for his company and physical attributes, his principal motivation in elevating Qawsun was to establish an outsider power base to balance the ambitions and power of his own Nasiri mamluks. The establishment of a counterbalance between the Nasiri mamluks and outsiders was a means by the sultan to avoid being toppled by powerful mamluk factions as he had been twice before.

According to the Mamluk historian Ibn Aybak as-Safadi, Qawsun was an-Nasir Muhammad's favorite emir after Baktamur as-Saqi, a fact which infuriated Qawsun. However, despite his resentment of Baktamur, Qawsun did not likely play a role in the 1332 assassination by poison of Baktamur and his son Ahmad. They were probably killed in a conspiracy by an-Nasir Muhammad, who had become wary of Baktamur's growing strength and ambition, and Emir Bashtak, a senior emir who was trained by Qawsun, and like the latter, was also an ethnic Mongol. Qawsun was one of the 17 senior Mamluk commanders who accompanied an-Nasir Muhammad on the Hajj of 1332, at around the same time when Baktamur's assassination took place. As-Safadi related that Qawsun had a hand in the arrest of Damascus's longtime viceroy Emir Tankiz al-Husami in 1340 as a result of a conflict between the two senior emirs, but there does not appear to be any mention of direct contact between Qawsun and Tankiz in Mamluk chronicles, according to Steenbergen.

== Strongman of Egypt ==
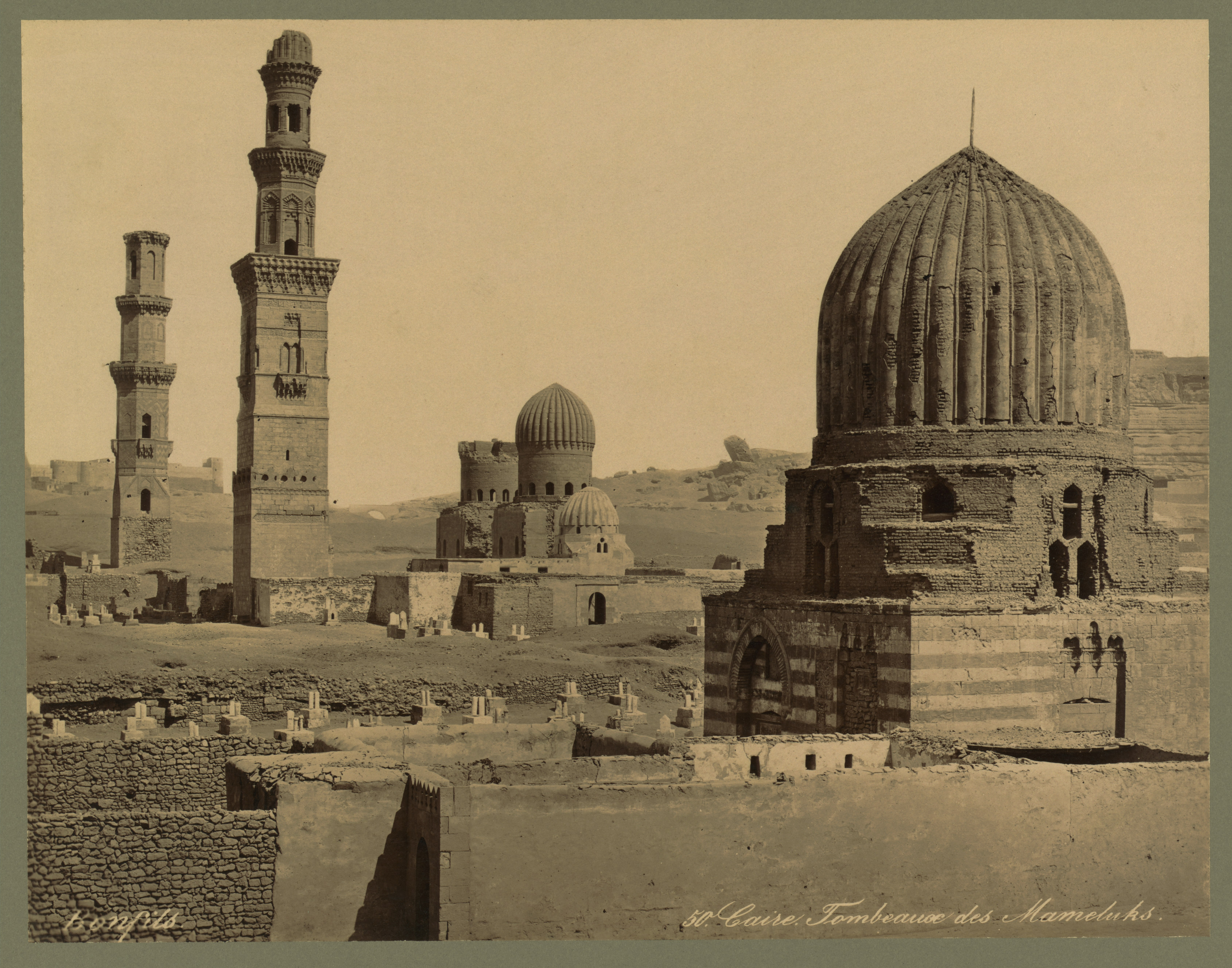
The remains of the mausoleum complex of Qawsun in the Southern Cemetery of Cairo. One of the mausoleum chambers is seen in the foreground on the right, while the still-intact minaret is visible on the left. (Photo from 1867)

In 1341, an-Nasir Muhammad became ill and sought to arrange for a successor from among his sons. His favored son Anuk died the year prior, and in picking another of his sons he consulted with Qawsun and Bashtak for advice. Qawsun and Bashtak had been on the brink of war as they jockeyed for supremacy when it became clear that their master's illness was poised to be fatal. They reconciled after other senior Mamluk emirs, including Sanjar al-Jawli and Baybars al-Ahmadi, pleaded with an-Nasir Muhammad to appoint a successor to prevent a conflagration in the aftermath of his death. An-Nasir Muhammad then gathered Qawsun and Bashtak and demanded they put aside their differences and cooperate. Moreover, the two emirs were entrusted with carrying out the sultan's orders regarding the selection of his successor. While Bashtak suggested that Ahmad should succeed his father, Qawsun lobbied for the accession of an-Nasir Muhammad's other son Abu Bakr. An-Nasir Muhammad ultimately chose the latter and explicitly warned against appointing Ahmad, whom he considered inept. In order to maintain the reconciliation between Qawsun and Bashtak, he appointed them as joint guardians of 20-year-old Abu Bakr.

Abu Bakr became sultan after an-Nasir Muhammad's death in June 1341, but actual power was held by Qawsun and the leading emirs (umara al-akabir) of an-Nasir Muhammad. Meanwhile, the reconciliation of Qawsun and Bashtak unraveled; three weeks after Abu Bakr's accession, Qawsun had Bashtak jailed. Qawsun and the senior emirs frustrated Abu Bakr's attempts to assert his authority. To avoid his potential arrest by Abu Bakr, Qawsun had him arrested in August on concocted charges of frivolous behavior. Qawsun had Abu Bakr and six of an-Nasir Muhammad's other sons incarcerated in Qus, where Abu Bakr was executed in November. Afterward, Qawsun arranged for Kujuk, an infant son of an-Nasir Muhammad, to replace Abu Bakr as sultan. In this arrangement, Qawsun served as na'ib as-saltana (viceroy) of Egypt, theoretically the second most powerful post in the sultanate, and as Kujuk's guardian. Qawsun proceeded to lavish gifts and grants to the Royal Mamluks, the backbone of the Mamluk army who were theoretically the personal mamluks of the sultan, and lower-ranking mamluks in a bid to gain their loyalty. Qawsun also had 700 of his own mamluks. With his formal position, a mamluk power base, apparent army support, and personal sources of wealth independent of the government-related iqta system, Qawsun became the effective leader of the sultanate.

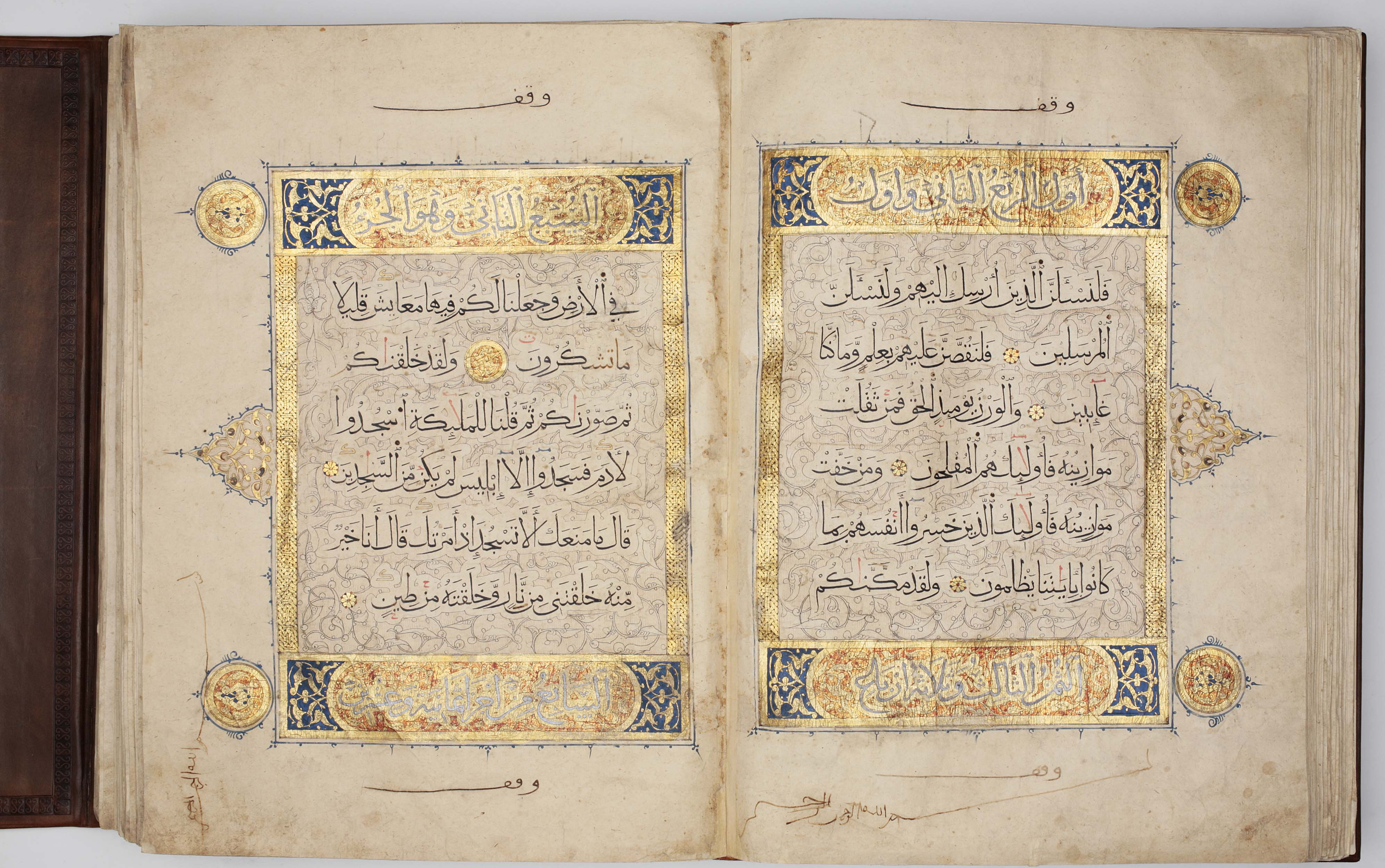
Double-page from the Qur'an manuscript endowed by Qawsun upon mosque in his mausoleum complex. Khalili Collection of Islamic Art

However, Qawsun's elimination of Abu Bakr, and his imprisonment of Bashtak and several of an-Nasir Muhammad's sons raised the ire of some mamluk factions. The staunchest early opponent of Qawsun to emerge was Tashtamur as-Saqi (known as Hummus Ahdar), the Mamluk na'ib (governor, pl. nuwwab) of Aleppo. He proceeded to rally opposition against Qawsun from among the Mamluk emirs of Syria. Tashtamur and other Mamluk opponents of Qawsun primarily used Qawsun's maltreatment of an-Nasir Muhammad's sons as the justification for their opposition. Meanwhile, Qawsun attempted to place an-Nasir Muhammad's son Ahmad, who was based in the Syrian desert fortress of al-Karak, in custody like his other brothers. Ahmad refused Qawsun's invitations to Cairo to ostensibly assume the sultanate, viewing the entreaty as a ruse. Instead, he turned to the Mamluk emirs of Syria for support, many of whom were sympathetic of Ahmad's predicament.

In response to Ahmad's refusal to come to Cairo, Qawsun took the advice of the Mamluk governor of Damascus, Altunbugha as-Salihi, and ordered a siege of al-Karak to force Ahmad's departure. The commander of the siege was Qutlubugha al-Fakhri, an able commander of an-Nasir Muhammad and Tashtamur's closest associate. While Qutlubugha had been an early supporter of Qawsun, after twenty days of besieging al-Karak and being harried by local Bedouin tribesmen, he defected to Ahmad, whom he subsequently recognized as sultan. Shati, a Bedouin leader from central Transjordan, communicated Qutlubugha's defection to Qawsun. In the aftermath of Qutlubugha's mutiny, Altunbugha, Aslam, the na'ib of Safad, the na'ib of Homs and Aruqtay, the na'ib of Tripoli rallied to Qawsun's defense, while Qutlubugha, Tashtamur and a number of Damascene emirs formed the core of the opposition. Qawsun permitted Altunbugha to suppress Ahmad's supporters, and the latter launched an offensive against Aleppo in November 1341, prompting Tashtamur's flight to the Seljuqs of Anatolia. With Tashtamur outside of Syria, Qawsun's hand in Syria appeared to have been strengthened. However, Qawsun's advantage was short-lived as Qutlubugha used Altunbugha's absence from Damascus as an opportunity to occupy the city. Qutlubugha gathered whatever army defectors he could muster, proclaimed Ahmad sultan and began initiatives to set up a bureaucratic administration for Ahmad. Meanwhile, Qawsun was dealt a blow to his financial resources and morale when the na'ib of Gaza, a supporter of Ahmad, appropriated Qawsun's sugar-production factory in the Jordan Valley.

Altunbugha began his return to Damascus after plundering Tashtamur's resources in Aleppo, but upon confronting Qutlubugha's troops at Khan Lajin north of Damascus, his far larger army stood down; Qutlubugha had bribed Altunbugha's mamluks before the battle. This was followed by a mass defection of his officers, including the Bedouin chief of the Al Fadl tribe, Sulayman ibn Muhanna, to Qutlubugha. In the following days, Ahmad gained recognition from the nuwwab of Gaza, Safad, Hama and Baalbek. Altunbugha managed to escape to Cairo via Gaza, but his inability to crush the mutiny in Syria significantly contributed to Qawsun's eventual downfall. Nonetheless, Altunbugha's arrival in Egypt with his remaining troops strengthened Qawsun's position in the capital. Qawsun granted them high-income iqta'at (pl. of iqta).

== Downfall and death ==
Despite the wealth Qawsun distributed among his supporters, Emir Aydughmish, his chief associate in managing the state, and the emirs al-Malik and Barsbugha, feared the potential heavy-handedness they would encounter should Qawsun assume the sultanate, which he seemed poised to do. They conspired to topple him, defecting from his camp in Cairo with large numbers of Royal Mamluks. They also conspired with Qawsun's chief personal assistant to hide his horses to prevent their use in battle. In late December 1341, the emirs launched an uprising against Qawsun. Cairene mobs formed demanding Qawsun's ouster and Qawsun's personal mamluks were attacked. Besieged in his citadel with little support, Qawsun and his last major loyalist, Altunbugha, submitted to the rebels. They were imprisoned in Alexandria. On 21 January 1342, Ahmad was proclaimed sultan in Cairo. The new sultan arrived in Cairo in March, and a few weeks thereafter he ordered the properties of Qawsun confiscated by the state. In April, Qawsun and Altunbugha were killed in prison, although it is not clear if their deaths were ordered by Ahmad. Qawsun's body was returned to Cairo for burial in his funerary complex.

== Bibliography ==
- Bauden, Frédéric (2009). "The Sons of al-Nāṣir Muḥammad and the Politics of Puppets: Where Did It All Start?" (PDF). Mamluk Studies Review. 13 (1). Middle East Documentation Center, The University of Chicago.
- Berchem, van, M. (1922). MIFAO 43 Matériaux pour un Corpus Inscriptionum Arabicarum Part 2 Syrie du Sud T.1 Jérusalem "Ville" (in French and Arabic). Cairo: Impr. de l'Institut français d'archéologie orientale. (p. 289, note 4)
- Drory, Joseph (2006). "The Prince who Favored the Desert: Fragmentary Biography of al-Nasir Ahmad (d. 745/1344)". In Wasserstein, David J.; Ayalon, Ami (eds.). Mamluks and Ottomans: Studies in Honour of Michael Winter. Routledge. ISBN 9781136579172.
- Holt, Peter Malcolm (1986). The Age of the Crusades: The Near East from the Eleventh Century to 151. Addison Wesley Longman Limited. ISBN 9781317871521.
- Levanoni, Amalia (1995). A Turning Point in Mamluk History: The Third Reign of Al-Nāṣir Muḥammad Ibn Qalāwūn (1310–1341). Brill. ISBN 9789004101821.
- Mayer, L.A. (1933). Saracenic Heraldry: A Survey. Oxford: Oxford University Press. (pp. 186 -188)
- Steenbergen, Jo Van (2001). "The Amir Qawsun: Statesman or Courtier? (720–741 AH/1320–1341 AD)". In Vermeulen, Urbain; Steenbergen, Jo Van (eds.). Egypt and Syria in the Fatimid, Ayyubid, and Mamluk Eras III. Peeters Publishers. ISBN 9789042909700.
- Williams, Caroline (2018). Islamic Monuments in Cairo: The Practical Guide (7th ed.). Cairo: The American University in Cairo Press. ISBN 9789774168550.
