= Ibrahim ibn Abd al-Rahman ibn al-Qaysarani =

Syrian scribe (died 1352)

Open pages from al-Nūr al-lāʾiḥ in the sole surviving copy, a richly decorated manuscript now in Paris.

Shams al-Dīn Ibrāhīm ibn ʿAbd al-Raḥmān ibn ʿAbd Allāh ibn al-Qaysarānī al-Khālidī (died May 1352) was a Syrian scribe and chancery official under the Mamlūks.

Ibrāhīm belonged to a prominent Syro-Palestinian family known as the Khālidīs or Banū l-Qaysarānī. They claimed descent from Khālid ibn al-Walīd. His great-grandfather, Khālid ibn al-Qaysarānī, served as the vizier of Nūr al-Dīn Maḥmūd ibn Zankī (d. 1174). His grandfather, Fatḥ al-Dīn ʿAbd Allāh ibn al-Qaysarānī, served as the vizier in Syria of three Mamlūk sultans. Ibrāhīm worked in Damascus and Cairo. He has entries in the biographical dictionaries of Ibn Ḥajar al-ʿAsqalānī and al-Ṣafadī. According to al-Ṣafadī, the death of his patron, Bahādur al-Tamurtāshī, who was Sultan al-Ṣāliḥ Ismāʿīl's brother-in-law, brought his steady advancement at court to an end in March 1343. He died in May 1352.

In the year AH 743 (AD 1342–1343), Ibrāhīm wrote a prose panegyric of the Sultan al-Ṣāliḥ Ismāʿīl for his accession in June 1342. Its full Arabic title is al-Nūr al-lāʾiḥ wa-l-durr al-sāḍiḥ fī ṣṭifāʾ mawlānā al-sulṭān al-malik al-Ṣāliḥ ('The Brilliant Light and the Necklace of Pearls, [Demonstrating] the Divine Election of Our Lord the Sultan, al-Ṣāliḥ Ismāʿīl'). The text was published in 1982. Its editor treated it as a history of the Ayyūbid and Mamlūk dynasties.

== Bibliography ==
- Holt, P. M. (1998). "Literary Offerings: A Genre of Courtly Literature". In Ulrich Haarmann; Thomas Philipp (eds.). The Mamluks in Egyptian Politics and Society. Cambridge University Press. pp. 3–16.
- Tadmurī, ʿUmar, ed. (1982). Ibrāhīm ibn ʿAbd al-Raḥmān ibn al-Qaysarānī al-Qurashī al-Khālidī: al-Nūr al-lāʾiḥ wa-l-durr al-sāḍiḥ fī ṣṭifāʾ mawlānā al-sulṭān al-malik al-Ṣāliḥ wa-huwa tārīkh salāṭīn al-Ayyūbīyīn wa-l-Mamālīk. Tripoli.
- Van Steenbergen, Jo (2012). "Qalāwūnid Discourse, Elite Communication and the Mamluk Cultural Matrix: Interpreting a 14th-Century Panegyric". Journal of Arabic Literature. 43: 1–28. doi:10.1163/157006412X629755. hdl:1854/LU-981404.
