= Al-Nasir Ahmad, Sultan of Egypt =

Al-Nasir Ahmad ibn Muhammad
- Al-Malik al-Nasir

Sultan of Egypt and Syria
- Reign: 21 January 1342 – 27 June 1342
- Predecessor: Al-Ashraf Kujuk
- Successor: Al-Salih Isma'il
- Born: 1316; Cairo, Mamluk Sultanate
- Died: 16 July 1344 (aged 27–28); Mamluk Sultanate
- Spouse: Zahirbugha Tahirbugha (m. 1331)
- Issue: None
Names
- Al-Malik al-Nasir Shihab ad-Din Ahmad ibn Muhammad
- House: Qalawuni
- Dynasty: Bahri
- Father: Al-Nasir Muhammad
- Mother: Bayad
- Religion: Islam

Al-Nasir Shihab ad-Din Ahmad ibn Muhammad ibn Qalawun (1316 – 16 July 1344), better known as al-Nasir Ahmad, was the Turkic Bahri Mamluk sultan of Egypt, ruling from January to June 1342. A son of Sultan al-Nasir Muhammad, he became embroiled in the volatile succession process following his father's death in 1341. Al-Nasir Ahmad lived much of his life in the desert fortress of al-Karak in Transjordan and was reluctant to assume the sultanate in Cairo, preferring al-Karak, where he was closely allied with the inhabitants of the city and the Bedouin tribes in its vicinity. His Syrian partisans, emirs Tashtamur and Qutlubugha al-Fakhri, successfully maneuvered to bring Syria under al-Nasir Ahmad's official control, while sympathetic emirs in Egypt were able to oust the Mamluk strongman Emir Qawsun and his puppet sultan, the five-year-old half-brother of al-Nasir Ahmad, al-Ashraf Kujuk. Al-Nasir Ahmad eventually assumed the sultanate after frequently delaying his departure to Egypt.

Al-Nasir Ahmad was known to be a seclusive sultan, surrounding himself with his coterie of supporters from al-Karak, rarely making direct contact with the Mamluk emirs of Egypt and avoiding the public view. Two months into his reign, he relocated to al-Karak with substantial sums from the treasury and several horses and senior administrative officials. He ruled from the desert fortress, leaving a deputy, Emir Aqsunqur al-Salari, to oversee affairs in Egypt on his behalf. His unorthodox rule, alleged frivolity, and his execution of loyal partisans, namely Tashtamur and Qutlubugha, led to al-Nasir Ahmad being deposed from the sultanate by his half-brother, al-Salih Isma'il. He remained in the fortress of al-Karak, which the Mamluks besieged at least seven times, until being captured in July 1344. He was killed later that month on the orders of al-Salih Isma'il.

== Early life and career ==
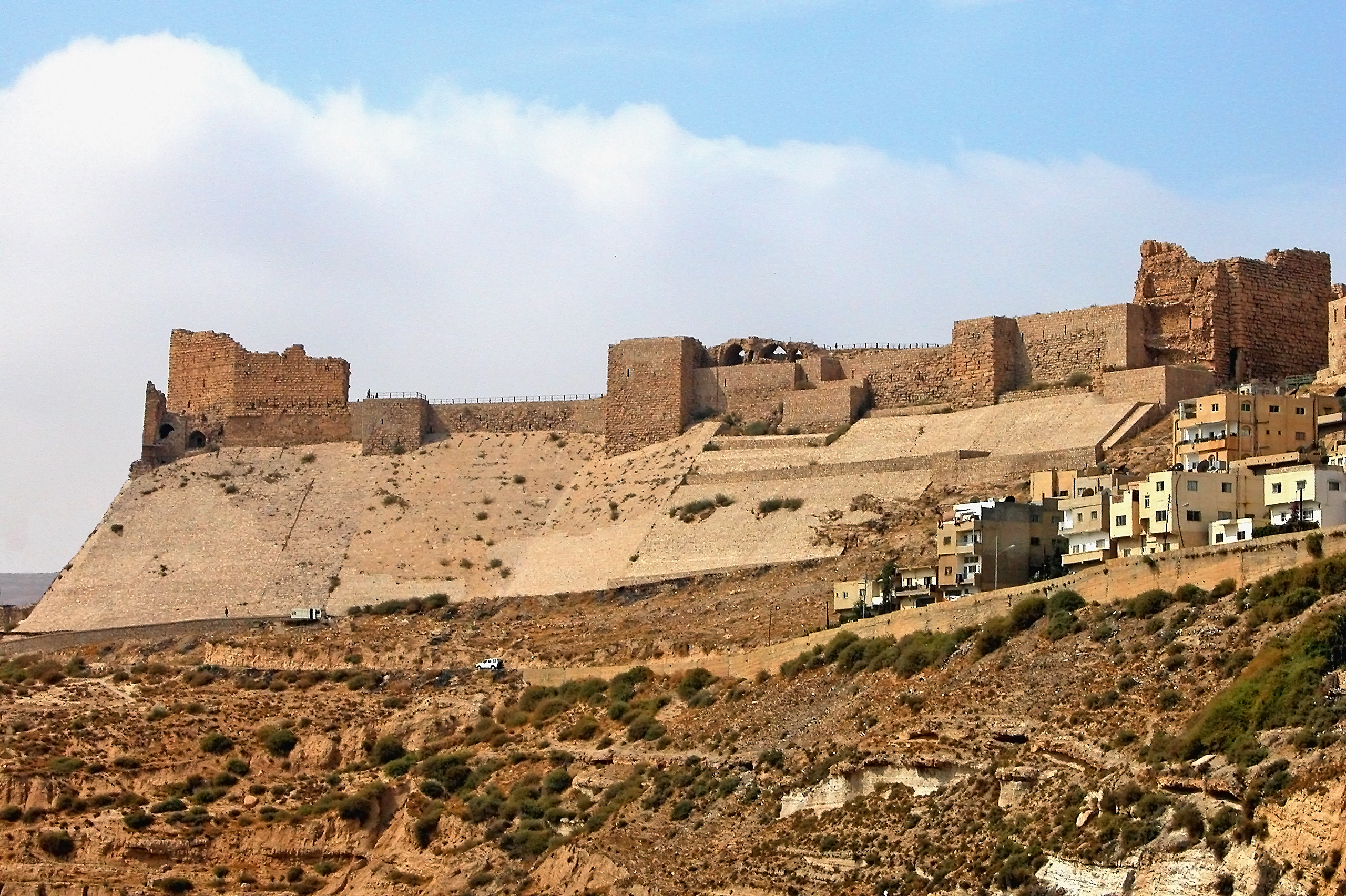
The fortress of al-Karak, where Ahmad was based for much of his life

Ahmad was born in 1316 or 1318. His father was Sultan al-Nasir Muhammad and his mother was Bayad, a singer and a slave girl freed by Emir Bahadur As and possibly given to al-Nasir Muhammad. At the time of his birth, Ahmad was al-Nasir Muhammad's only son (three other sons had died before Ahmad was born) and the only son of al-Nasir Muhammad born to Bayad. Bayad and al-Nasir Muhammad later divorced and the former married Maliktamur al-Sarjuwani, an emir who became Ahmad's stepfather. As a youth, Ahmad spent frequent bouts of time in the desert fortress of al-Karak under orders from his father. He was first sent there in 1324 under supervision and with a large budget to begin training in horsemanship and hunting. He was sent again in April 1326. Since Ayyubid times, but particularly during al-Nasir Muhammad's reign, al-Karak, which was isolated from the other Mamluk centers, became akin to a private academy for young Mamluk emirs where they could gain and perfect chivalric skills. Thus, Ahmad's residency in al-Karak was intended to imbue in him knightly qualities. While at al-Karak, Ahmad was under the supervision of its governor, Bahadur al-Badri. Nothing about Ahmad in the Mamluk-era sources is known between 1326 and 1331.

In May 1331, Ahmad was recalled to Cairo, under the escort of Badri, where he was made an emir. His allotment of an emirate occurred on 30 September with much pomp and festivities. The following day, Ahmad left Cairo for al-Karak. Sometime in 1331, prior to Ahmad's arrival in Cairo, Bayad died. Her widower, Maliktamur, was appointed governor of al-Karak concurrent with Ahmad and Badri's arrival in Cairo. Maliktamur was ordered to raise Ahmad and ensure his education. In 1332, Ahmad and his brother Abu Bakr, who had also been at al-Karak at the time, met al-Nasir Muhammad and the latter's favored son and Ahmad's much younger brother, Anuk, at the Red Sea town of Aqaba, south of al-Karak. From there, they were to accompany their father to Mecca for the Hajj pilgrimage, but at the last minute, al-Nasir Muhammad sent Ahmad, Abu Bakr and Anuk to al-Karak under Maliktamur's care. Nothing is known about Ahmad's life between the latter event and 1337.

Ahmad was recalled to Cairo in 1337 by his angered father after the latter learned that Ahmad had been intimately associating with the riffraff of al-Karak. Upon Ahmad's arrival, al-Nasir Muhammad saw to it that Ahmad be married to Zahirbugha Tayirbugha, a daughter of one of al-Nasir Muhammad's leading emirs. Ahmad returned to al-Karak with his wife, who had been growing increasingly ill. At some point that year, Ahmad fell out with Maliktamur and requested from his father that the governorship of Mamlakat al-Karak (al-Karak Province) be transferred to him, a request which al-Nasir Muhammad acceded to. Ahmad thus became the governor of the fortresses of al-Karak and Shawbak, although al-Nasir Muhammad appointed an ustadar (majordomo), Emir Zumurrudi, to supervise him.

=== Relationship with Shuhayb ===
Zumurrudi reported back to al-Nasir Muhammad that Ahmad was behaving poorly, dressing as a Bedouin and was spending much of his time drinking with a Bedouin boy, Shuhayb, whom Ahmad had fallen in love with. As a consequence for his behavior, Ahmad was ordered by al-Nasir Muhammad to return to Cairo with Shuhayb in March 1339. Ahmad was received without fanfare and Shuhayb was jailed. In protest at the latter action, Ahmad forsook food and isolated himself to his quarters in the Cairo Citadel. Al-Nasir Muhammad sent his two most senior emirs, Bashtak and Qawsun, to persuade or threaten Ahmad to abandon his relationship with Shuhayb, but to no avail; Ahmad told the emirs if "this young man [Shuhayb] is punished, I will kill myself!" Ahmad also refused an offer from his father that would have transferred one hundred of al-Nasir Muhammad's mamluks to Ahmad's service in return for Ahmad's abandonment of Shuhayb. Al-Nasir Muhammad ultimately relented and abandoned hopes that Ahmad could succeed him as sultan. Instead, he released Shuhayb and made Ahmad an emir of forty mounted mamluks (the second highest Mamluk military rank). Ahmad was also made to stay in Egypt, while Abu Bakr was sent to al-Karak, likely replacing Ahmad as governor of the province.

In 1341, Shuhayb and a eunuch entered into a dispute related to a pigeon racing competition, in which the eunuch mistreated Shuhayb. In response, Ahmad had the eunuch severely beaten, and when news of the incident reached al-Nasir Muhammad, the latter attempted to force Ahmad to banish Shuhayb, again sending emirs Qawsun and Bashtak to communicate his demands to Ahmad. Ahmad refused, stating to Qawsun and Bashtak that while they each had a hundred young boys and girls, he had "contented" himself "with regard to worldly pleasures with only this boy because he has shared my exile, having left his family. How can I expel him? If the sultan commands that I do so, then let him expel me too". Ahmad was indeed expelled to Sarkhad, accompanied by Maliktamur. However, upon the intervention of some of al-Nasir Muhammad's emirs, wives and his harem, al-Nasir Muhammad decided to have Ahmad return to Cairo while Ahmad was still on his way to Sarkhad, although he first sold all of Ahmad's horses. Al-Nasir Muhammad also ultimately decided to send Ahmad back to al-Karak with Maliktamur, who was also reappointed governor of Mamlakat al-Karak.

== Conflict over the sultanate ==
Al-Nasir Muhammad died in June 1341. His reign was marked by a centralization of autocratic power in the Mamluk Sultanate. Shortly before his death, al-Nasir Muhammad discussed his succession with his two senior emirs, Qawsun and Bashtak. The latter supported Ahmad's nomination, but Qawsun supported Ahmad's younger brother Abu Bakr. Al-Nasir Muhammad also favored Abu Bakr and believed Ahmad was unfit to rule. He rejected Bashtak's suggestion, stating "As for Ahmad, who is in al-Karak, do not let him cross [the soil of] Egypt; do not put him in charge of anything, because he would cause the ruin of the state!" Following al-Nasir Muhammad's death, In May or June 1341, Abu Bakr was proclaimed sultan, but was virtually a ceremonial ruler, with Qawsun holding the reins of power as mudabbir al-dawla (organizer of the state), in effect the strongman of Egypt. He imprisoned Abu Bakr in the Upper Egyptian city of Qus where he was executed on trumped up charges of frivolity. Qawsun thereafter arranged for al-Nasir Muhammad's five-year-old son, al-Ashraf Kujuk, to be declared sultan, further consolidating Qawsun's power.

Ahmad was in al-Karak at the time of Abu Bakr's execution and Qawsun called on him to report to Cairo, ostensibly to assume the sultanate. However, Ahmad viewed the invitation Cairo as a ruse by Qawsun to eliminate him. He responded in September 1341 that he would not report to Cairo unless the leading emirs of the sultanate appeared before him in al-Karak and gave him their oaths of loyalty and on the condition that his other brothers imprisoned in Qus would be relocated to al-Karak. Ahmad concurrently sent letters to the Mamluk emirs of Syria requesting their support against Qawsun, who proceeded to besiege al-Karak to coerce Ahmad to depart for Cairo. The siege was commanded by the Syrian emir, Qutlubugha al-Fakhri, while Ahmad had the support of al-Karak's inhabitants and the Bedouin tribes of the vicinity. Twenty days into his siege, Qutlubugha defected from Qawsun, recognized Ahmad as sultan and promised the latter his unconditional support. Qutlubugha was persuaded to defect from Qawsun by the Mamluk na'ib (governor) of Aleppo, Tashtamur. The latter argued that Qutlubugha should support Ahmad out of respect for the bonds of loyalty they owed to Ahmad's father, their master. From then on, Ahmad gained the honorific prefix of al-Nasir, like his father.

Qutlubugha's recognition of Ahmad as sultan was officially an act of mutiny since it was done while al-Ashraf Kujuk technically held office. It led to divisions among the Syrian Mamluk leadership, with the governors of Safad, Tripoli and Homs led by Altunbugha al-Salihi of Damascus supporting Qawsun, while Tashtamur, Qutlubugha, the governor of Gaza, the Al Fadl tribe of Palmyra, and a number of Damascene emirs supporting al-Nasir Ahmad. As Altunbugha left Damascus to lead an expedition against Tashtamur, pursuing the latter to southeastern Anatolia, Qutlubugha moved into Damascus where he proclaimed al-Nasir Ahmad sultan and began to reorganize the bureaucracy with the support of Damascene emirs opposed to Altunbugha. Qutlubugha prepared to strike Altunbugha, who attempted to wrest back control of Damascus, but most of his forces defected and he escaped to Cairo. Afterward, the governors of Damascus, Safad, Gaza, Hama, and Baalbek formally recognized al-Nasir Ahmad as sultan, with apparent popular support. Nonetheless, Ahmad insisted that he remain in al-Karak instead of assuming the sultanate in Damascus unless Tashtamur, his most loyal supporter, accompanied him to Damascus from Anatolia. In the meantime, he gave Qutlubugha the authority to appoint Syrian governors as the new na'ib al-saltana (viceroy) of Syria. At one point during the political machinations in al-Karak, some of Ahmad's mamluks killed Shuhayb, an act which emotionally traumatized Ahmad.

== Reign ==
Qawsun's position in Egypt was precarious and he was ultimately arrested, along with Altunbugha, in Alexandria. Afterward, a delegation of Egypt-based emirs, namely Jankali ibn Baba, Baybars al-Ahmadi and Qimari Amir Shikar, arrived in al-Karak to inform al-Nasir Ahmad of Qawsun's ouster and to invite him to Cairo to assume the sultanate, to which al-Nasir Ahmad refused. On 21 January 1342, al-Ashraf Kujuk was dethroned and al-Nasir Ahmad declared sultan despite the latter's absence from Cairo. Qutlubugha expected al-Nasir Ahmad to meet him in Damascus where the two men could march from there to Cairo triumphantly in royal procession, but al-Nasir Ahmad opted for a more low-key procession from Gaza, which frustrated Qutlubugha, more so when al-Nasir Ahmad did not show up in Gaza. Instead, al-Nasir Ahmad departed for Cairo without Qutlubugha in February, reaching Cairo in mid-March. In Bedouin attire, he affirmed his title and declared "I was not yearning for royalty, and found that place [al-Karak] adequate.

In Cairo, al-Nasir Ahmad did not partake in the usual royal feast and the public prayer during the Eid al-Fitr holiday. He surrounded himself with his coterie of supporters from al-Karak, refused to meet directly with the Mamluk emirs of Egypt, avoided the public view, and was generally seclusive. He ordered Qawsun and Altunbugha as well as the governor of Qus who oversaw the execution of Abu Bakr to be executed. He assigned many of his unqualified supporters from al-Karak to senior administrative offices, to the chagrin of the Mamluk emirs in Egypt. Tashtamur played an integral role in al-Nasir Ahmad's administration. However, Tashtamur's arbitrary conduct in office and his selective approach to al-Nasir Ahmad's orders turned the latter against him, and with support from the leading Mamluk emirs who were also frustrated with Tashtamur, al-Nasir Ahmad had Tashtamur imprisoned in May 1342. In addition, al-Nasir Ahmad ordered Qutlubugha to be confined to Damascus, while Mamluk emirs in Egypt sought to eliminate Qutlubugha. The latter was able to leave Egypt unharmed, but before reaching Beisan from Jenin, he was arrested by the governor of Safad, Baybars al-Ahmadi, who extradited him to Egypt.

By the end of May, al-Nasir Ahmad decided to rule the sultanate from al-Karak, the only place he felt secure from Mamluk plots, real or perceived. He departed with large sums from the sultan's treasury, huge numbers of al-Nasir Muhammad's Arabian horses and livestock, and was accompanied by the arrested emirs, Tashtamur and Qutlubugha, along with Karaki supporters, the muhtasib (chief market inspector) of Cairo and the chief scribe. He also sought to relocate Caliph al-Hakim II to al-Karak, and managed to install him in Gaza, ostensibly as an interim headquarters. Al-Nasir Ahmad reached al-Karak relatively quickly (in six days). He had left Cairo in the care of his newly appointed deputy, the governor of Gaza, Aqsunqur al-Salari. From al-Karak, al-Nasir Ahmad issued decrees that reached Cairo through a mediator from al-Karak; al-Nasir Ahmad rarely communicated directly with the Mamluks of Egypt, preferring to use mediators instead. According to al-Maqrizi, Ahmad's "most important confidant among the people of al-Karak" was Baligh ibn Yusuf ibn Tayyi, the commander of Arab forces in the fortress. He was repeatedly asked to return to Cairo by the Mamluks of Egypt, but refused each time.

In al-Karak, al-Nasir Ahmad had Tashtamur and Qutlubugha executed for unclear reasons. The move to execute them appalled the public, with whom al-Nasir Ahmad was steadily losing credibility. The executions were seen as evidence of al-Nasir Ahmad's ingratitude to the men who had supported him and virtually installed him as sultan. Historian Joseph Drory argues that it was because Tashtamur and Qutlubugha compelled him to assume the sultanate and remove him from his self-imposed isolation in al-Karak that made al-Nasir Ahmad resentful toward them.

== Deposition and death ==
In Cairo, the senior Mamluk emirs resolved to depose al-Nasir Ahmad and replace him with his half-brother al-Salih Isma'il in June 1342. The decision was supported by the governors of the Syrian provinces, who defected from al-Nasir Ahmad after learning of the executions of Tashtamur and Qutlubugha and reports of al-Nasir Ahmad's decadent behavior in al-Karak. Despite being dethroned and not having apparent ambitions outside of al-Karak, al-Nasir Ahmad was still viewed as a threat by the sultan; al-Nasir Muhammad had been exiled in al-Karak when he marched to Cairo and seized the throne. Seven expeditions against al-Nasir Ahmad were launched between his deposition and 1344. Each siege was aborted. They often lasted for a few months, cost huge sums, and at times, ended with the dismissal of officers. The Mamluks had difficulty gaining the key support of the local Bedouin tribes, who were allies of al-Nasir Ahmad.

In the summer of 1344, Baligh, whose supporters and kinsmen served as Ahmad's well-spring of support, defected to the sultan's army. The local defectors informed besieging Mamluks of a vulnerability in al-Karak's defenses. With this intelligence, on 4 July, the Mamluks, under the command of Emir Sanjar al-Jawli, entered the fortress and captured al-Nasir Ahmad, who had been wounded and was treated with respect by his captors. Still suspicious of his Egyptian captors, he refused to eat meals provided by them, only agreeing to eat food handled by his al-Karak partisans. He was sent to Cairo, where al-Salih Isma'il secretly ordered to have him decapitated by a mercenary on 16 July. Al-Nasir Ahmad's head was brought to the Cairo Citadel where it was displayed. His body was buried at the foot of the fortress of al-Karak.

== Legacy ==
Al-Nasir Ahmad's four-month reign was judged to be a disappointment by Mamluk-era historians. Ibn Iyas wrote that expectations of al-Nasir Ahmad being a "victorious lion" upon his ascension to the sultanate ended with him receiving the appellation of the "crazy teacher", while Ibn Hajar al-Asqalani wrote that he was "truly a terrible administrator, a hedonist and a drunkard". Ibn Taghribirdi asserted that al-Nasir Ahmad was thoughtless, frivolous and the worst of al-Nasir Muhammad's sons. Al-Maqrizi repeated the alleged warning of al-Nasir Muhammad that al-Nasir Ahmad should never "enter Egypt ... for he will be a ground for the ruin of the monarchy".

== Bibliography ==
- Bauden, Frederic (2004). "The Recovery of Mamluk Chancery Documents in an Unsuspected Place". In Winter, Michael; Levanoni, Amalia (eds.). The Mamluks in Egyptian and Syrian Politics and Society. Leiden: Brill. ISBN 9004132864.
- Bauden, Frédéric (2009). "The Sons of al-Nāṣir Muḥammad and the Politics of Puppets: Where Did It All Start?" (PDF). Mamluk Studies Review. 13 (1). Middle East Documentation Center, The University of Chicago.
- Drory, Joseph (2006). "The Prince who Favored the Desert: Fragmentary Biography of al-Nasir Ahmad (d. 745/1344)". In Wasserstein, David J.; Ayalon, Ami (eds.). Mamluks and Ottomans: Studies in Honour of Michael Winter. Routledge. ISBN 9781136579172.
- Rappoport, Angelo Solomon (1904). History of Egypt From 330 B.C. To the Present Time, Volume (12 of 12). London: Groiler Society.
- Rowson, Everett K. (2008). "Homoerotic Liaisons among the Mamluk Elite in Late Medieval Egypt and Syria". In Babayan, Kathryn; Najmabadi, A. (eds.). Islamicate Sexualities: Translations Across Temporal Geographies of Desire. President and Fellows of Harvard College. ISBN 9780674032040.
- Sharon, M. (2009). Handbook of Oriental Studies: The Near and Middle East. Corpus inscriptionum Arabicarum Palaestinae. BRILL. ISBN 978-90-04-17085-8.

Al-Nasir Ahmad, Sultan of Egypt Bahri dynasty Cadet branch of the Mamluk Sultanate Born: 1316 Died: 16 July 1344
Regnal titles
Preceded by Al-Ashraf Kujuk	Sultan of Egypt and Syria; 21 January 1342 – 27 June 1342	Succeeded by Al-Salih Ismail
