= Al-Mansur Abu Bakr =

- Al-Malik al-Mansur

Sultan of Egypt and Syria
- Reign: 7 June 1341 – 5 August 1341
- Predecessor: An-Nasir Muhammad
- Successor: Al-Ashraf Kujuk
- Born: c. 1321; Cairo, Mamluk Sultanate
- Died: November 1341 (aged 20); Qus, Mamluk Sultanate
- Spouse: Daughter of Emir Tuquzdamur al-Hamawi
Names
- Al-Malik al-Mansur Sayf ad-Din Abu Bakr ibn Muhammad ibn Qalawun
- House: Qalawuni
- Dynasty: Bahri
- Father: An-Nasir Muhammad
- Mother: Narjis
- Religion: Islam

Al-Malik al-Mansur Sayf ad-Din Abu Bakr (Arabic: الملك المنصور سيف الدين أبو بكر), better known as al-Mansur Abu Bakr (المنصور أبو بكر), (ca. 1321 – November 1341) was a Bahri Mamluk Sultan of Egypt in 1341. From an early age, Abu Bakr received military training in the desert town of al-Karak. His father, Sultan an-Nasir Muhammad (r. 1310–41), groomed him as a potential successor to the throne and made him an emir in 1335. He was consistently promoted in the following years, becoming the na'ib (governor) of al-Karak in 1339. In June 1341, he became sultan, the first of several sons of an-Nasir Muhammad to accede to the throne. However, his reign was short-lived; in August, Abu Bakr was deposed and arrested by his father's senior emir, Qawsun. Abu Bakr was imprisoned in the Upper Egyptian city of Qus, along with many of his brothers, and executed on Qawsun's orders two months later. He was formally succeeded by his younger half-brother, al-Ashraf Kujuk, but Qawsun was left as the strongman of the sultanate.

== Early life and career ==
Abu Bakr was born around 1321 to his sultan father an-Nasir Muhammad (r. 1310–1341) and his concubine mother, Narjis. Narjis also gave birth to Abu Bakr's younger full brothers Ramadan (died 1343) and Yusuf (died 1346). Information about Abu Bakr's early childhood is unavailable in the Mamluk sources. The first mention of Abu Bakr came in 1332. At that time, Abu Bakr had been sent to the desert fortress of al-Karak to join his half-brothers Ahmad and Ibrahim in their military training. Also during that year, Abu Bakr left al-Karak to accompany his father and half-brothers Anuk and Ahmad at al-Aqaba and from there to Mecca to perform the Hajj pilgrimage. However, an-Nasir Muhammad had them return to al-Karak before the trek to Mecca.

In 1335, Abu Bakr was recalled to Cairo and made an emir by his father. The event was marked by a royal procession, led by Emir Qawsun, in which Abu Bakr was dressed in the attire of an emir. At around the same time, an-Nasir Muhammad arranged Abu Bakr's marriage to a daughter of Emir Tuquzdamur al-Hamawi, who married Narjis sometime earlier. (Note: Abu Bakr's mother and Sultan an-Nasir Muhammad's concubine, Narjis, was married off by the sultan to Tuquzdamur al-Hamawi to consolidate networks of dependency and loyalty among the Mamluk elite.) Later, during his 59-day reign as sultan, Abu Bakr also married two slave girls, spending 100,000 gold dinars for each of their bridal veils. In 1337/38, Abu Bakr was promoted to an amir arba'in (emir of forty [mounted mamluks]).

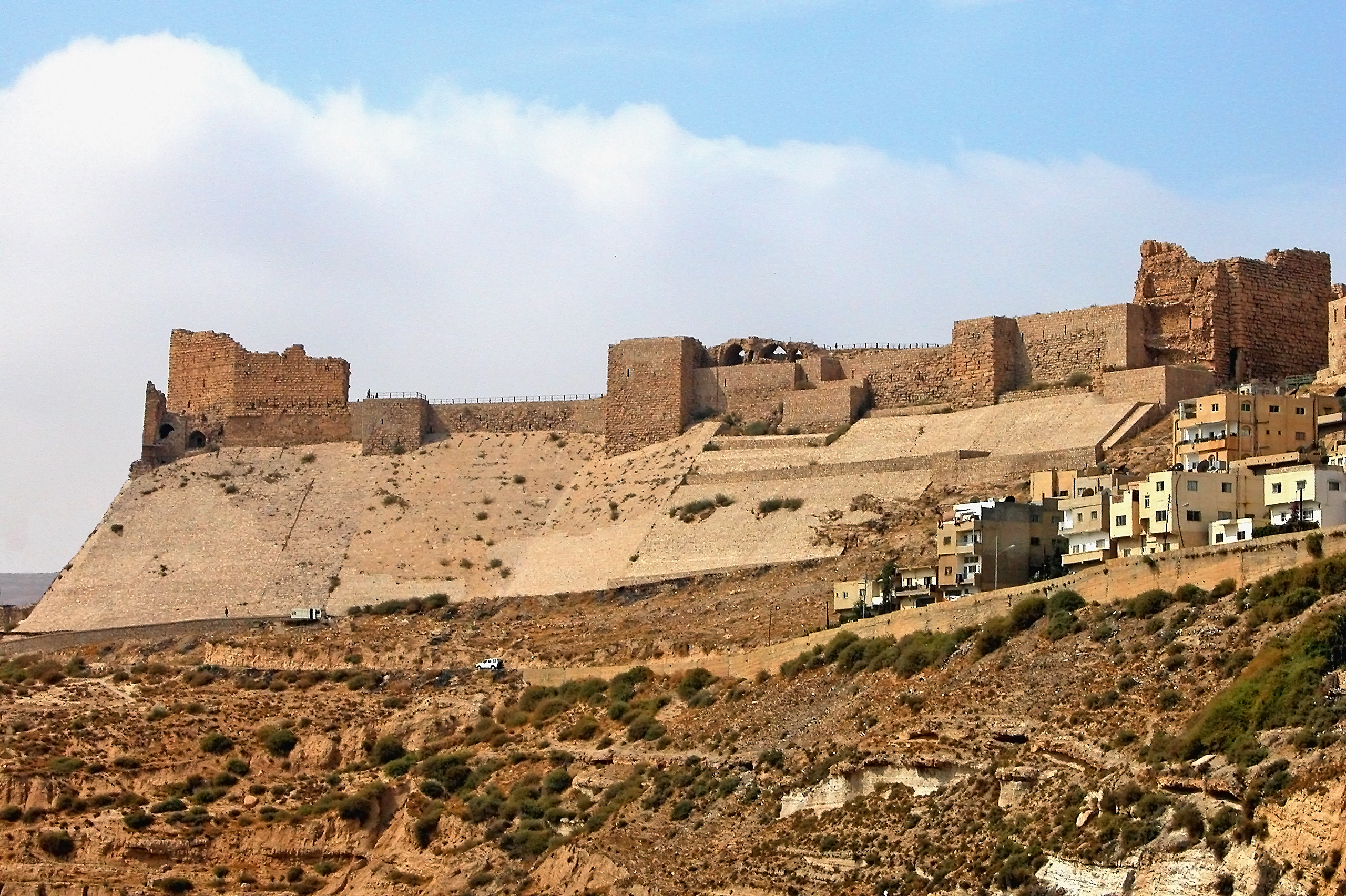
For several years, Abu Bakr was based in the desert fortress of al-Karak (pictured), where he gained military training and briefly served as governor.

Abu Bakr was sent back to al-Karak in 1339 to replace Ahmad as na'ib of the province. By then, Ahmad had been dropped by an-Nasir Muhammad as a potential successor. Anuk remained the sultan's favored son to replace him, but with Ahmad deemed unfit to rule, Abu Bakr became the runner-up. Sometime that year, Abu Bakr paid a visit to his father with a gift of 200,000 silver dirhams that he apparently extorted from the inhabitants of al-Karak. He later returned to al-Karak where he remained until 17 July 1340. At that point, Anuk had been dropped as a potential successor by the sultan, who invited Abu Bakr back to Cairo. There, an-Nasir Muhammad had his emirs swear an oath of allegiance to Abu Bakr.

Abu Bakr then set off for al-Karak until he was recalled to Cairo once more in 1341, arriving on 24 January. When he returned, he brought his father a sum of 100,000 dirhams, while an-Nasir Muhammad issued another order recalling all of Abu Bakr's mamluks and soldiers in al-Karak to Cairo. Abu Bakr remained in Cairo effectively to wait for his ailing father to die. In the months prior to an-Nasir Muhammad's death, Abu Bakr was given a large iqta (fief), his interests were put under the care of Emir Bashtak and he was transferred a large number of wafidiyya (immigrant, typically Mongol, soldiers) from Aleppo and other troops. On 4 June 1341, while on his deathbed, an-Nasir Muhammad had all of his emirs recognize the transfer of the sultanate to Abu Bakr in the event of his death. Moreover, he crowned Abu Bakr as "al-Malik al-Mansur", the title of the latter's grandfather, Sultan Qalawun (r. 1277–90), and gave him Qalawun's sword. The throne was peacefully passed to Abu Bakr when an-Nasir Muhammad died on 7 June.

== Reign ==
Although Abu Bakr was made sultan, the reins of power were held by an-Nasir Muhammad's senior emirs, chief among whom were his son-in-law Qawsun and Bashtak. According to historian Amalia Levanoni, Abu Bakr sought to restore the traditional concepts of mamluk-master relations and the modes of hierarchical advancement set by his grandfather Qalawun and abrogate the growing independence of the emirs that developed under his father. However, the post-Qalawun mamluk norms of conduct proved too resilient for Abu Bakr. In the view of the emirs and the low and middle-ranking mamluks, Abu Bakr was to solely play the role of a figurehead and not disturb the system created by his father. Thus, Abu Bakr's attempts to rule in his own right were consistently stymied by the emirs. Of the latter, the most prominent was Qawsun, who sought to become the mudabbir ad-dawla (organizer of the state), in effect the strongman of the sultanate. After neutralizing Bashtak, his principal rival, Qawsun moved against Abu Bakr; Qawsun had feared that Abu Bakr would attempt to imprison him.

On 5 August 1341, Qawsun had Abu Bakr arrested on concocted charges of frivolity. Abu Bakr and six of his brothers were subsequently sent to prison in Qus in Upper Egypt. In November 1341, Abu Bakr was executed by the governor of Qus on orders from Qawsun. After his death, Qawsun installed Abu Bakr's infant half-brother, Kujuk, as sultan and became the Kujuk's regent. Meanwhile, dissent mounted against Qawsun in Syria and Cairo and he was ousted in a revolt, along with Kujuk. The new sultan, Abu Bakr's half-brother Ahmad, later had Qawsun and the governor of Qus (who apologized for killing Abu Bakr) executed in early 1342.

== Bibliography ==
- Bauden, Frédéric (2009). "The Sons of al-Nāṣir Muḥammad and the Politics of Puppets: Where Did It All Start?" (PDF). Mamluk Studies Review. 13 (1). Middle East Documentation Center, The University of Chicago.
- Drory, Joseph (2006). "The Prince who Favored the Desert: Fragmentary Biography of al-Nasir Ahmad (d. 745/1344)". In Wasserstein, David J.; Ayalon, Ami (eds.). Mamluks and Ottomans: Studies in Honour of Michael Winter. Routledge. ISBN 9781136579172.
- Levanoni, Amalia (1995). A Turning Point in Mamluk History: The Third Reign of Al-Nāṣir Muḥammad Ibn Qalāwūn (1310–1341). Brill. ISBN 9789004101821.

Al-Mansur Abu Bakr Bahri dynasty Cadet branch of the Mamluk Sultanate Born: 1321 Died: November 1341
Regnal titles
| Preceded by An-Nasir Muhammad | Sultan of Egypt and Syria; 7 June 1341 – August 1341 | Succeeded by Al-Ashraf Kujuk |
