= Al-Ashraf Kujuk =

Sultan of Egypt and Syria (r. 1341–1342)

Küçük (Kujuk/Küchük)
- Al-Malik al-Ashraf

Sultan of Egypt and Syria
- Reign: 5 August 1341 – 21 January 1342
- Predecessor: Al-Mansur Abu Bakr
- Successor: An-Nasir Ahmad
- Regent: Qawsun
- Born: 1334; Cairo, Mamluk Sultanate
- Died: September 1345 (aged 11); Mamluk Sultanate
- Issue: None
Names
- Al-Malik al-Ashraf Ala'a ad-Din Kujuk ibn Muhammad ibn Qalawun
- House: Qalawuni
- Dynasty: Bahri
- Father: An-Nasir Muhammad
- Mother: Ardu
- Religion: Islam

Al-Ashraf Ala'a ad-Din Kujuk ibn Muhammad ibn Qalawun (Arabic: الأشرف علاءالدين كجك), better known as al-Ashraf Kujuk (also spelled Küçük/Küchük), (1334 – September 1345) was the Mamluk sultan from August 1341 to January 1342. He was a young child on the throne, and real power was held by his regent Emir Qawsun, a senior aid to Kujuk's father Sultan an-Nasir Muhammad (r. 1310–41). When Qawsun was ousted in a mamluk revolt in late December 1341, Kujuk was deposed in the weeks after. Kujuk was later murdered at the age of eleven as a result of the political intrigues in the sultanate.

== Biography ==
Kujuk was born in 1334 to father Sultan an-Nasir Muhammad (r. 1310–41) and his Tatar wife Ardu. In August 1341, Kujuk, then five or six, was installed as sultan by the strongman of Egypt, Emir Qawsun, who served as his regent and in effect, held the reins of power. Kujuk was appointed following Qawsun's arrest and execution of Sultan al-Mansur Abu Bakr, Kujuk's elder half-brother and predecessor. Kujuk was removed from the throne on 21 January 1342 and replaced by his elder half-brother an-Nasir Ahmad after Qawsun was ousted and killed in a mamluk revolt.

After his deposition, Kujuk returned to the care of his mother in the women's quarters in the Cairo Citadel. During the reign of Kujuk's half-brother as-Salih Isma'il (r. 1342–1345), Kujuk was seen by as-Salih Isma'il and his mother as a potential contender for the throne. In August 1345, as-Salih Isma'il died of an illness that he had been suffering from for months. His mother accused Kujuk's mother of having used sorcery to cause as-Salih Isma'il's illness. As a result, Kujuk was murdered in September 1345 at the age of eleven.

== Bibliography ==
- Drory, Joseph (2006). "The Prince who Favored the Desert: Fragmentary Biography of al-Nasir Ahmad (d. 745/1344)". In Wasserstein, David J.; Ayalon, Ami (eds.). Mamluks and Ottomans: Studies in Honour of Michael Winter. Routledge. ISBN 9781136579172.
- Holt, Peter Malcolm (1986). The Age of the Crusades: The Near East from the Eleventh Century to 151. Addison Wesley Longman Limited. ISBN 9781317871521.

Al-Ashraf Kujuk Bahri dynasty Cadet branch of the Mamluk Sultanate Born: 1334 Died: September 1345
Regnal titles
Preceded by Al-Mansur Abu Bakr	Sultan of Egypt and Syria; August 1341 – 21 January 1342 with Qawsun	Succeeded by An-Nasir Ahmad
