= Al-Salih Ismail, Sultan of Egypt =

Sultan of Egypt and Syria (r. 1342–1345)

Isma'il
- Al-Malik as-Salih

Sultan of Egypt and Syria
- Reign: June 1342 – August 1345
- Predecessor: An-Nasir Ahmad
- Successor: Al-Kamil Sha'ban
- Born: 1326; Cairo, Mamluk Sultanate
- Died: 1345 (aged 20); Cairo, Mamluk Sultanate
- Spouse: Ittifaq; Bint Baktamur as-Saqi; Bint Tuquzdamur al-Hamawi
- Issue: None
Names
- Al-Malik as-Salih Imad ad-Din Abu'l Fida Isma'il
- House: Qalawuni
- Dynasty: Bahri
- Father: An-Nasir Muhammad
- Religion: Islam

As-Salih Imad ad-Din Abu'l Fida Isma'il, better known as as-Salih Isma'il, (1326 – 1345) was the Bahri Mamluk sultan of Egypt between June 1342 and August 1345. He was the fourth son of an-Nasir Muhammad to succeed the latter as sultan. His reign saw a level of political stability return to the sultanate. Under his orders or those close to him, his two predecessors and brothers, al-Ashraf Kujuk and an-Nasir Ahmad, were killed. He was succeeded by another brother, al-Kamil Sha'ban.

== Early life and family ==
Isma'il was born in 1324 or 1325 and was likely named after the Ayyubid emir of Hama at the time, Abu'l Fida Isma'il. The latter was a highly favored emir of Isma'il's father, the Mamluk sultan an-Nasir Muhammad (r. 1310–1341). Isma'il's mother was a concubine of an-Nasir Muhammad, whose name is not provided by the Mamluk-era sources.

In 1342, Isma'il married a black slave girl named Ittifaq and had a son (unnamed in sources) with her that year. On 11 July 1343, he married a daughter of Emir Baktamur as-Saqi and had a daughter with her. The following year, on 2 January 1344, he married a daughter of Emir Tuquzdamur al-Hamawi.

== Reign ==
Frontispiece of Ibrahim al-Qaysarani's panegyric of as-Salih

Following an-Nasir Muhammad's death in 1341, three of his sons inherited the sultanate in succession, although the first two, al-Mansur Abu Bakr and al-Ashraf Kujuk, were sultans in name only while senior Mamluk emirs held the actual reins of power. The third son, an-Nasir Ahmad, came to power in January 1342, but was a highly seclusive leader who ruled from the isolated desert fortress of al-Karak, beginning in May. His refusal to return to Cairo and his alienation of the Egyptian emirs led to his dethronement in June. Isma'il, by then known as "as-Salih Isma'il" was chosen by the leading emirs to replace his half-brother Ahmad. He was 17 at the time of his accession to the sultanate in June, but was already well known for his piety. Moreover, he made a pact with the leading Mamluk emirs that he would bring no harm to a mamluk, unless he committed an injustice, in return for the emirs' loyalty.

An-Nasir Ahmad refused to surrender the regalia of the sultanate or recognize Isma'il's accession. Isma'il resolved to arrest him and sent a total of eight military expeditions against an-Nasir Ahmad in al-Karak. The final siege, commanded by Emir Sanjar al-Jawli, succeeded in early July 1344, and an-Nasir Ahmad was captured and soon murdered on the secret orders of Isma'il, who hired a mercenary to accomplish the task. Meanwhile, al-Ashraf Kujuk, who was a young child at the time and was under the care of his mother after being ousted from the sultanate in January 1342, was killed along with his mother as a result of Isma'il's mother's hatred of the ex-sultan; Isma'il had become gravely ill in late 1344 and his mother blamed his illness on al-Ashraf Kujuk's alleged sorcery. In July 1345, Isma'il became bed-ridden and died in August. His stepfather, Arghun al-Ala'i, who had acquired several concurrent senior posts under Isma'il, arranged for Isma'il's full brother, al-Kamil Sha'ban to succeed him as sultan by purchasing many of Isma'il's mamluks on Sha'ban's behalf.

== Legacy ==
Isma'il was deemed the best of an-Nasir Muhammad's sons by the Mamluk-era historian Ibn Taghribirdi. However, according to historian Peter Malcolm Holt, Isma'il' "made little impression on the course of events in his short reign". Isma'il was praised by the Mamluk-era historian Ibrahim al-Qaysarani as the "renewer" (mujaddid) of the Islamic faith in the sultanate during the closing of the first 100 years of Mamluk rule.

== Bibliography ==
- Drory, Joseph (2006). "The Prince who Favored the Desert: Fragmentary Biography of al-Nasir Ahmad (d. 745/1344)". In Wasserstein, David J.; Ayalon, Ami (eds.). Mamluks and Ottomans: Studies in Honour of Michael Winter. Routledge. ISBN 9781136579172.
- Holt, P. (1986). The Age of the Crusades: The Near East from the Eleventh Century to 151. Addison Wesley Longman Limited. ISBN 9781317871521.
- Holt, P. (1998). "Literary Offerings: A Genre of Courtly Literature". In Philipp, Thomas; Haarmann, Ulrich (eds.). The Mamluks in Egyptian Politics and Society. Cambridge University Press. ISBN 9780521591157.
- Sharon, M. (2009). Handbook of Oriental Studies: The Near and Middle East. Corpus inscriptionum Arabicarum Palaestinae. BRILL. ISBN 978-90-04-17085-8.

Al-Salih Ismail, Sultan of Egypt Bahri dynasty Cadet branch of the Mamluk Sultanate Born: 1326 Died: 4 August 1345
Regnal titles
Preceded by An-Nasir Ahmad	Sultan of Egypt and Syria; June 1342 – August 1345	Succeeded by Al-Kamil Sha'ban
