= Aba-Khana =

Old neighborhood in Baghdad, Iraq

Aba-Khana (Arabic: العباخانة) is a neighborhood in old Baghdad, Iraq, located on the eastern side. The area was formerly known as Hammam al-Ra'i (Arabic: حمام الراعي, romanized: The Shepherd's Bath). It is bordered by the neighborhoods of Sayyid Sultan Ali (also known as al-Murabba'a) to the south, al-'Ammar (also known as Saba' Abkar) to the west, and Qatir-Khana to the north. The Iraqi sociologist, Ali al-Wardi, states in one of his books that the area was given this name after a textile factory. This factory was established by the viceroy of Baghdad, Namık Pasha, in 1864. It produced clothing and tents to meet the needs of the Ottoman army and was powered by steam. The people of Baghdad called this factory by the names "Aba-Khana" or "Qatir-Khana." These names then became the official names of two neighborhoods, including this one.

On 5 September 1911, the first cinema in Iraq was opened in Aba-Khana. It was named the Baghdad Tograph Cinema, or the Bloki Cinema. Named after its British owner, Bloki Cree. It was opened by the Ottoman viceroy, Ahmed Jamal Pasha.

== Textile factory ==
Around the 1820s, the last Mamluk viceroy of Baghdad, Dawud Pasha, set up a cotton and textile factory in Baghdad to serve the needs of the Ottoman army. This factory was likely inspired by Muhammad Ali Pasha's examples in Egypt. The well-known factory in Aba-Khana was then established by Namık Pasha in 1864 for the same reasons. The factory was enlarged by his successor, Midhat Pasha, in 1969. Its daily output was 300 meters of woolen clothes and 4000 meters of canvas. The factory continued to work until 1950. the factory was called the Aba-Khana.
