= Mamluk =

Slave-soldiers and enslaved mercenaries in the Muslim world

Mamluks
- مماليك
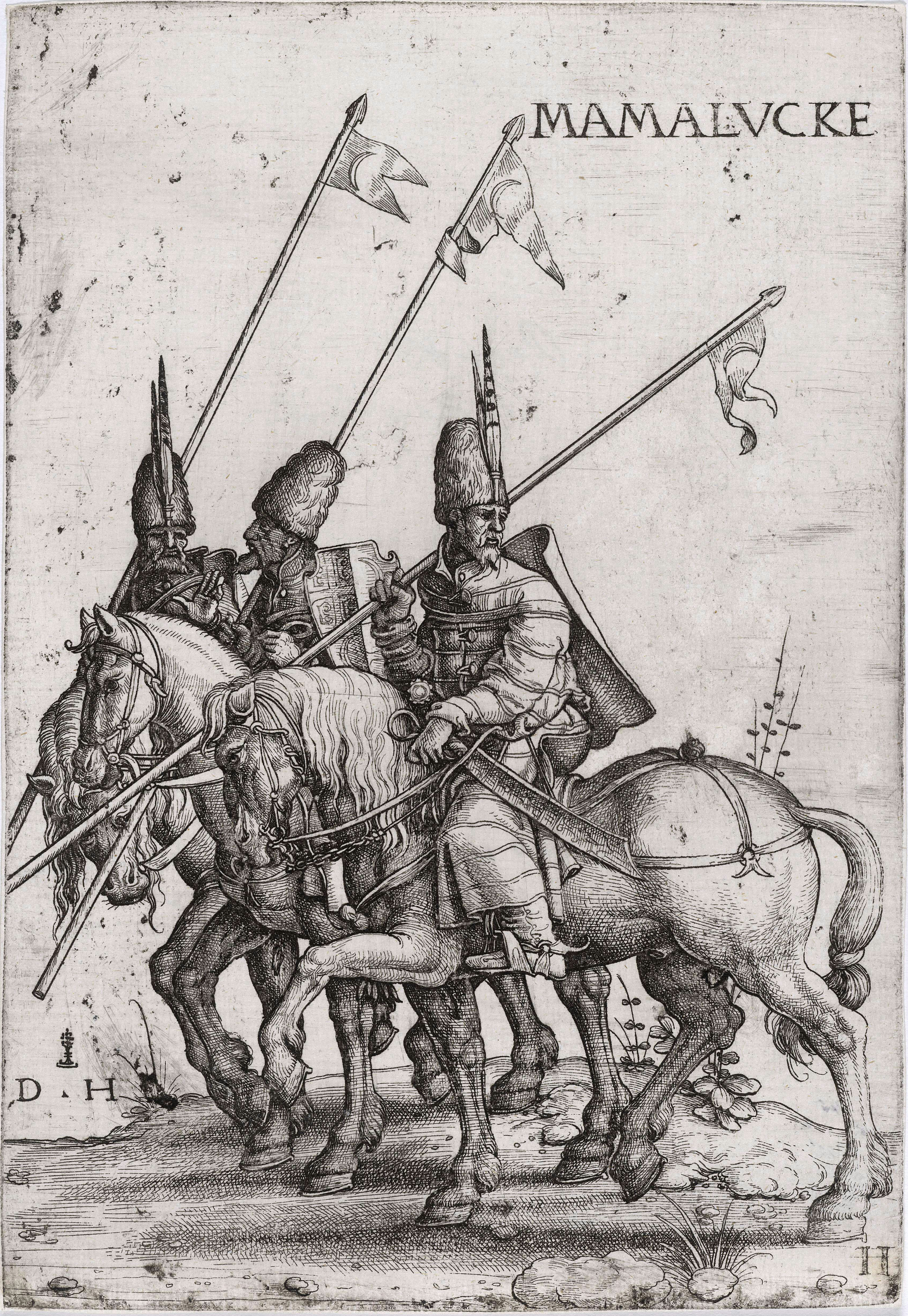
- Ottoman Mamluk lancers, early 16th century. Etching by Daniel Hopfer (c. 1526–1536), British Museum, London
- Active: 830s–1811
- Country: Abbasid Caliphate; Fatimid Caliphate; Seljuk Empire; Ayyubid Sultanate; Mamluk Sultanate; Delhi Sultanate; Ottoman Empire; Mughal Empire
- Type: Enslaved, mercenaries, slave-soldiers, freed slaves

Mamluk, mamaluk, or mameluke (/ˈmæmluːk/; Arabic: مملوك, romanized: mamlūk (singular), مماليك, mamālīk (plural); translated as "one who is owned", meaning "slave") were non-Arab, ethnically diverse (mostly Turkic, Caucasian, Mongol, Eastern and Southeastern European) enslaved mercenaries, slave-soldiers, and freed slaves who were assigned military and administrative duties in the Muslim world. They were purchased as military slaves, converted to Islam, and trained in martial and courtly skills. Upon completion of their training they were freed, but remained part of the ruling military caste, forming elite regiments and, in some periods and regions, rising to sovereign power.

The most enduring Mamluk legacy was the knightly military class in medieval Egypt, which developed from the ranks of slave-soldiers. Originally the Mamluks were slaves of Turkic origins from the Eurasian Steppe, but the institution of military slavery spread to include Circassians, Mongols, Georgians, Armenians, Russians, and Hungarians, as well as peoples from the Balkans such as Albanians, Greeks, and South Slavs (see Saqaliba). They also recruited from the Egyptians. The "Mamluk/Ghulam Phenomenon", as David Ayalon dubbed the creation of the specific warrior class, was of great political importance; for one thing, it endured for nearly 1,000 years, from the 9th century to the early 19th. (See: Ghilman.)

Over time, Mamluks became a powerful military knightly class in various Muslim societies that were controlled by dynastic Arab rulers. Particularly in Egypt and Syria, but also in the Ottoman Empire, Levant, Mesopotamia, and India, Mamluks held political and military power. In some cases, they attained the rank of sultan, while in others they held regional power as emirs or beys. Most notably, Mamluk factions seized the sultanate centered on Egypt and Syria, and controlled it as the Mamluk Sultanate (1250–1517). The Mamluk Sultanate famously defeated the Ilkhanate at the Battle of Ain Jalut. They had earlier fought the western European Christian Crusaders in 1154–1169 and 1213–1221, effectively driving them out of Egypt and the Levant. With the capture of Ruad in 1302, the Mamluk Sultanate formally expelled the last Crusaders from the Levant, ending the era of the Crusades.

While Mamluks were purchased as property, they were enslaved mercenaries and their status was above that of ordinary slaves, who were not allowed to carry weapons or perform certain tasks. In places such as Egypt, from the Ayyubid dynasty to the time of Muhammad Ali, Mamluks were considered to be "true lords" and "true warriors", with social status above that of the general population in the Middle East.

== Overview ==
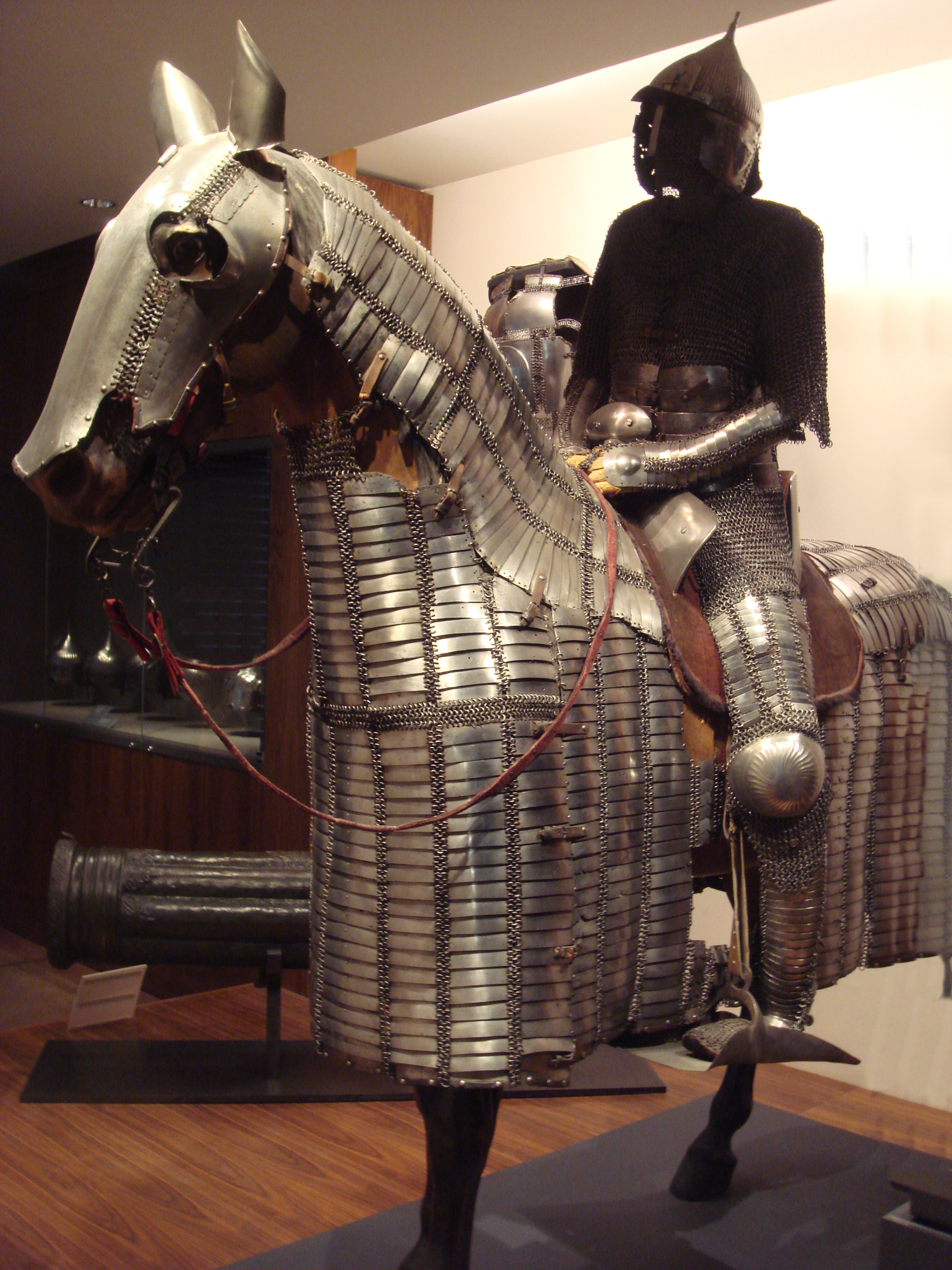
Mail and plate armour with full horse armor of an Ottoman Mamluk horseman (circa 1550), Musée de l'Armée, Paris

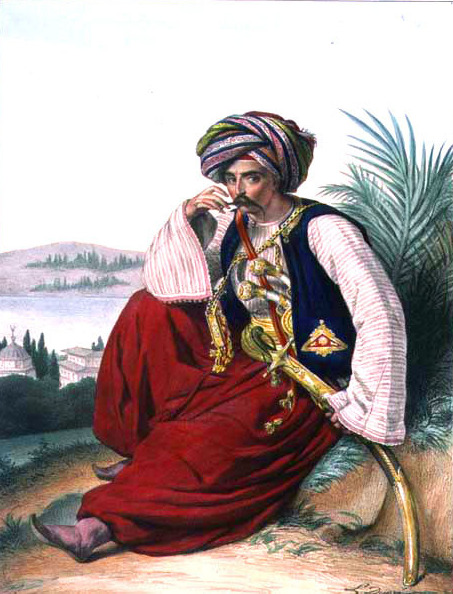
A Muslim Greek Mamluk portrayed by Louis Dupré (oil on canvas, 1825)

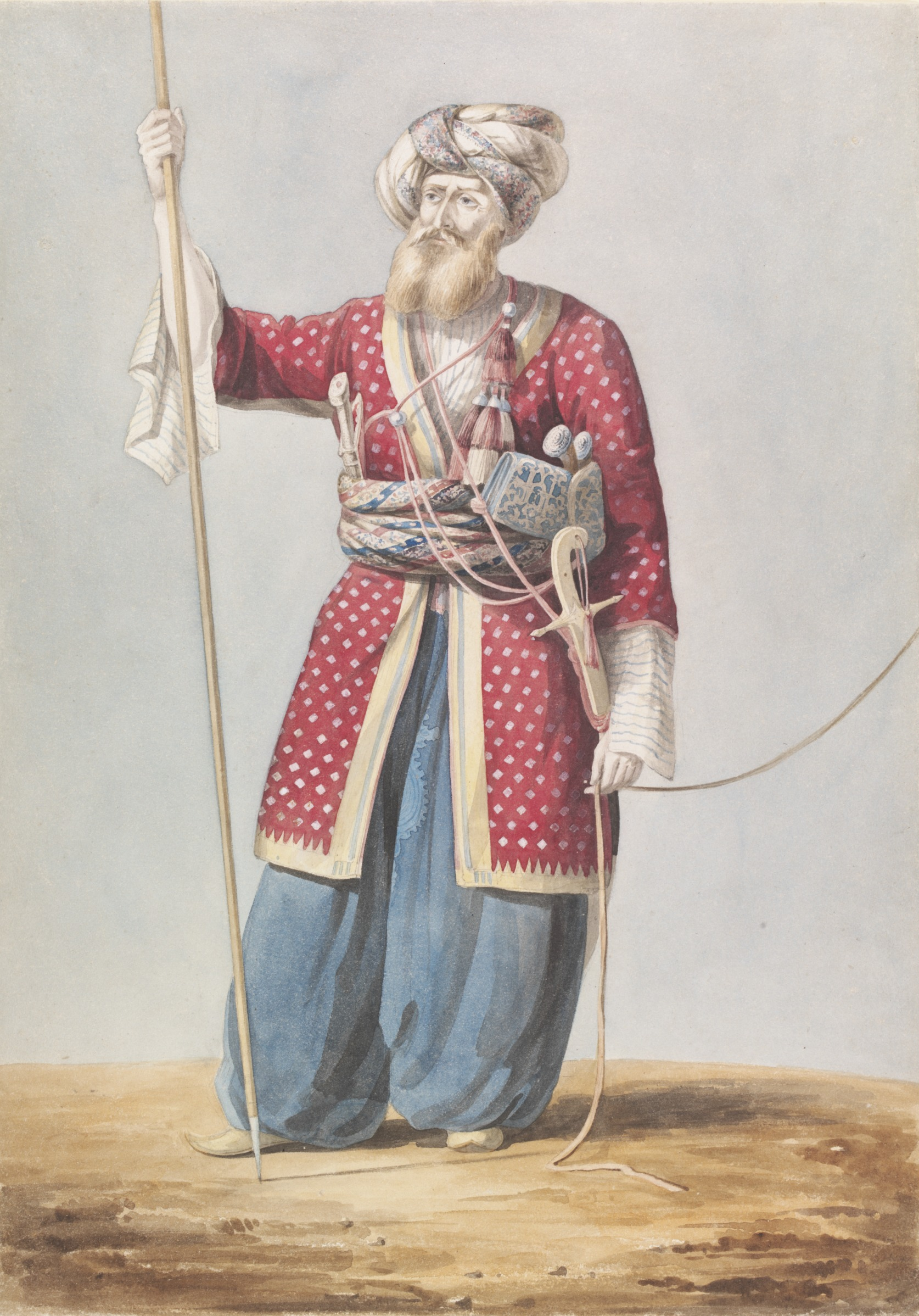
A Mamluk nobleman from Aleppo (Ottoman Syria, 19th century)

Daniel Pipes argued that the first indication of the Mamluk military class was rooted in the practice of early Muslims such as Zubayr ibn al-Awwam and Uthman ibn Affan who, before Islam, owned many slaves and practiced Mawla (Islamic manumission of slaves). The Zubayrids army under Abd Allah ibn al-Zubayr, son of Zubayr, used these freed slave retainers during the second civil war.

Meanwhile, historians agree that the massive implementation of a slave military class such as the Mamluks appears to have developed in Islamic societies beginning with the 9th-century Abbasid Caliphate based in Baghdad, under the Abbasid caliph al-Muʿtaṣim. Until the 1990s, it was widely believed that the earliest Mamluks were known as Ghilman or Ghulam (another broadly synonymous term for slaves) (Note: David Ayalon uses the term "Mamluk" to refer to military slaves in Egypt and Syria, and "Ghulam" (sing. of "Ghilman") to refer to military slaves elsewhere in the Muslim world. For further information, see: Sourdel, Dominique (2012) [1965]. "G̲h̲ulām". In Bosworth, C. E.; van Donzel, E. J.; Heinrichs, W. P.; Lewis, B.; Pellat, Ch.; Schacht, J. (eds.). Encyclopaedia of Islam. Vol. 2 (2nd ed.). Leiden: Brill Publishers. doi:10.1163/1573-3912_islam_COM_0237. ISBN 978-90-04-07026-4.; Ayalon, David (2012) [1991]. "Mamlūk". In Bosworth, C. E.; van Donzel, E. J.; Heinrichs, W. P.; Lewis, B.; Pellat, Ch. (eds.). Encyclopaedia of Islam, Second Edition. Vol. 6. Leiden: Brill Publishers. doi:10.1163/1573-3912_islam_COM_0657. ISBN 978-90-04-08112-3.) and were bought by the Abbasid caliphs, especially al-Muʿtaṣim (833–842).

By the end of the 9th century, such slave warriors had become the dominant element in the military. Conflict between the Ghilman and the population of Baghdad prompted the caliph al-Muʿtaṣim to move his capital to the city of Samarra, but this did not succeed in calming tensions. The caliph al-Mutawakkil was assassinated by some of these slave soldiers in 861 (see Anarchy at Samarra).

Since the early 21st century, historians have suggested that there was a distinction between the Mamluk system and the (earlier) Ghilman system, in Samarra, which did not have specialized training and was based on pre-existing Central Asian hierarchies. Adult slaves and freemen both served as warriors in the Ghilman system. The Mamluk system developed later, after the return of the caliphate to Baghdad in the 870s. It included the systematic training of young slaves in military and martial skills. The Mamluk system is considered to have been a small-scale experiment of al-Muwaffaq, to combine the slaves' efficiency as warriors with improved reliability. This recent interpretation seems to have been accepted.

After the fragmentation of the Abbasid Empire, military slaves, known as either Mamluks or Ghilman, were used throughout the Islamic world as the basis of military power. The Fatimid Caliphate (909–1171) of Egypt had forcibly taken adolescent male Armenians, Turks, Sudanese, and Copts from their families to be trained as slave soldiers. They formed the bulk of their military, and the rulers selected prized slaves to serve in their administration. The powerful vizier Badr al-Jamali, for example, was a Mamluk from Armenia. In Iran and Iraq, the Buyid dynasty used Turkic slaves throughout their empire. The rebel al-Basasiri was a Mamluk who eventually ushered in Seljuq dynastic rule in Baghdad after attempting a failed rebellion. When the later Abbasids regained military control over Iraq, they also relied on the Ghilman as their warriors.

Under Saladin and the Ayyubids of Egypt, the power of the Mamluks increased, and they claimed the sultanate in 1250, ruling as the Mamluk Sultanate. Throughout the Islamic world, rulers continued to use enslaved warriors until the 19th century. The Ottoman Empire's devşirme, or "gathering" of young slaves for the Janissaries, lasted until the 17th century. Regimes based on Mamluk power thrived in such Ottoman provinces as the Levant and Egypt until the 19th century.

== Organization ==
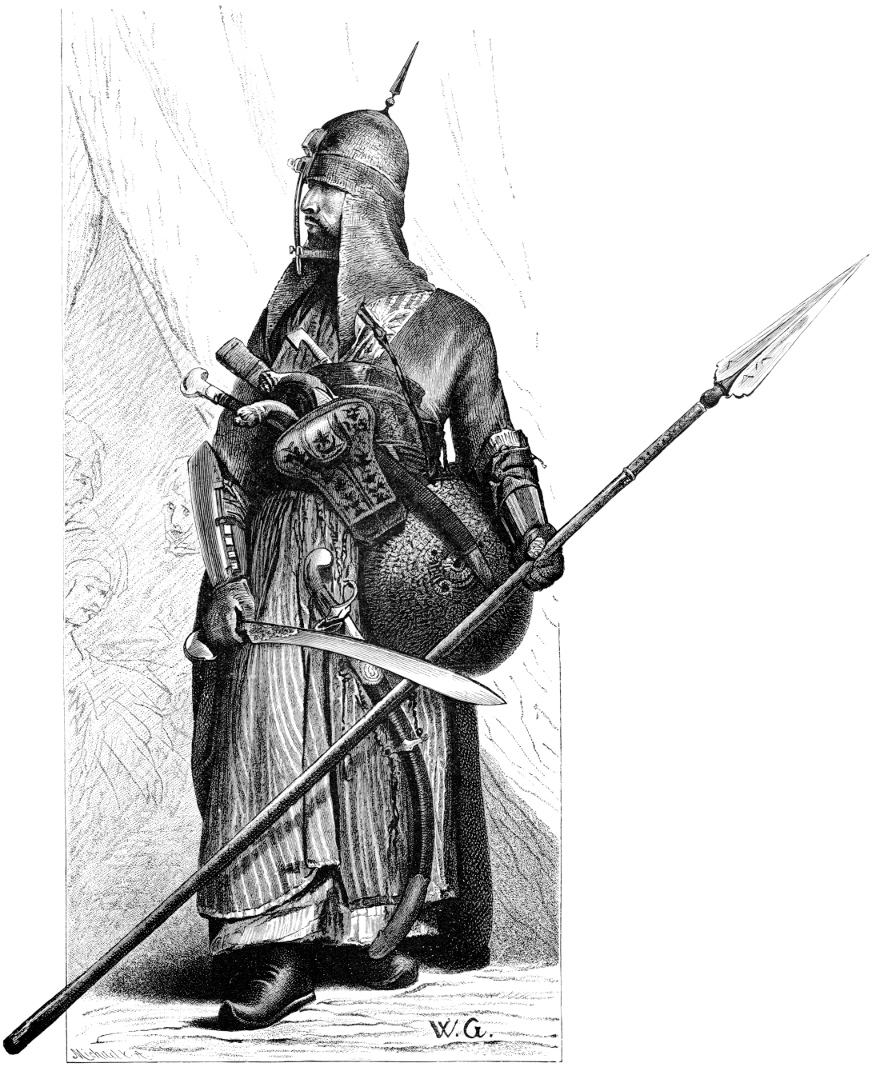
An Egyptian Mamluk warrior in full armor and armed with lance, shield, Mameluke sword, yatagan and pistols.

Under the Mamluk Sultanate of Cairo, Mamluks were purchased while still young males. They were raised in the barracks of the Citadel of Cairo. Because of their isolated social status (no social ties or political affiliations) and their austere military training, they were trusted to be loyal to their rulers. When their training was completed, they were discharged, but remained attached to the patron who had purchased them. Mamluks relied on the help of their patron for career advancement, and likewise, the patron's reputation and power depended on his recruits. A Mamluk was "bound by a strong esprit de corps to his peers in the same household".

Adult Mamluks were not slaves, but former slaves. The Mamluks were sons of kafir (non-Muslim) parents from Dar al-harb (non-Muslim lands); they were bought on the slave market as children, converted to Islam and brought up in military barracks where they were raised to become Muslim soldiers, during which they were raised, as slave children without families, to view the sultan as their father and the other mamluks as their brothers. Their education was finished by the kharj ceremony, during which they were manumitted and given a position in either the courtly administration or the army, and were free to begin a career as a free ex-slave Mamluk. Mamluk slave soldiers were preferred to freeborn soldiers because they were raised to view the army and their sultan-ruler as their family. They were thus seen as more loyal than a freeborn soldier, who would have a biological family to whom they would have their first loyalty.

Mamluks lived within their garrisons and mainly spent their time with each other. Their entertainments included sporting events such as archery competitions and presentations of mounted combat skills at least once a week. The intensive and rigorous training of each new recruit helped ensure continuity of Mamluk practices.

Sultans owned the largest number of mamluks, but lesser amirs also owned their own troops. Many Mamluks were appointed or promoted to high positions throughout the empire, including army command. At first their status was non-hereditary. Sons of Mamluks were prevented from following their father's role in life. However, over time, in places such as Egypt, the Mamluk forces became linked to existing power structures and gained significant amounts of influence on those powers.

== Relations with homelands and families ==
In Egypt, studies have shown that mamluks from Georgia retained their native language, were aware of the politics of the Caucasus region, and received frequent visits from their parents or other relatives. In addition, they sent gifts to family members or gave money to build useful structures (a defensive tower, or even a church) in their native villages.

== Egypt ==
=== Early origins in Egypt ===
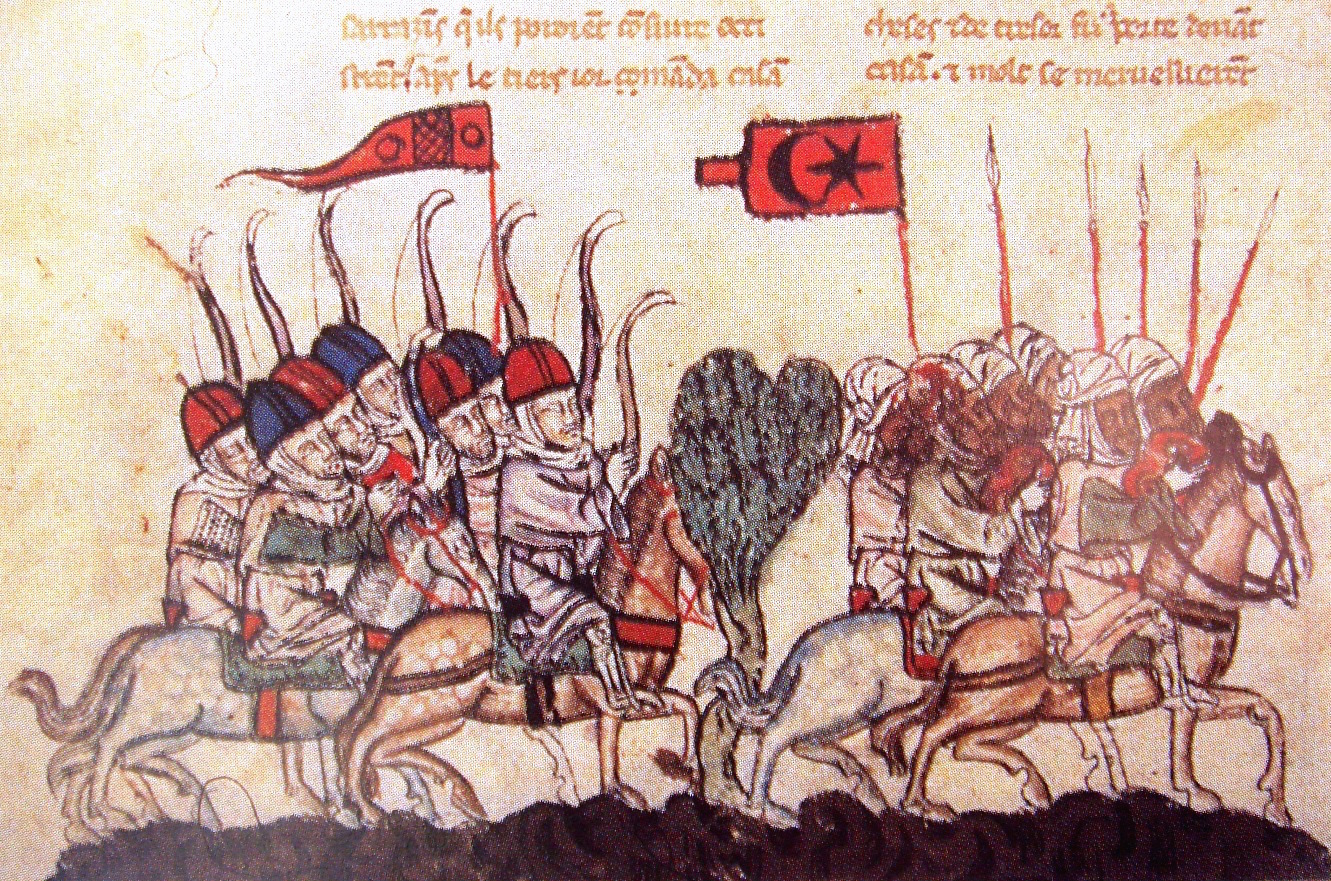
The battle of Wadi al-Khazandar, 1299. depicting Mongol archers and Mamluk cavalry; 14th-century illustration from a manuscript of the History of the Tatars.

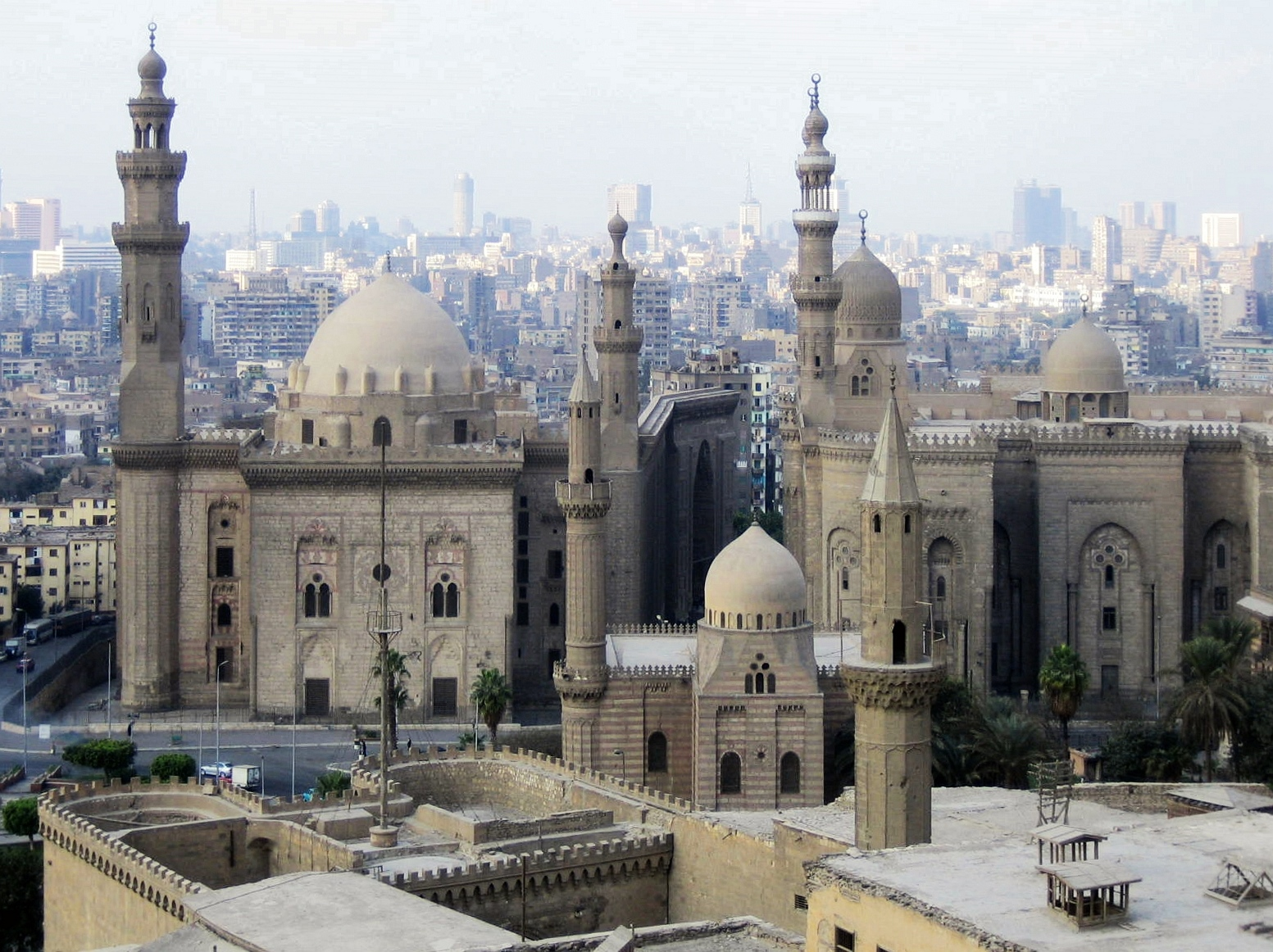
Mosque-Madrassa of Sultan Hassan (left) along with the later Al-Rifa'i Mosque (right) and two Ottoman mosques (foreground) in Cairo

The practice of recruiting slaves as soldiers in the Muslim world and turning them into Mamluks began in Baghdad during the 9th century CE, and was started by the Abbasid caliph al-Muʿtaṣim.

From the 900s through the 1200s, medieval Egypt was controlled by dynastic foreign rulers, notably the Ikhshidids, Fatimids, and Ayyubids. Throughout these dynasties, thousands of Mamluk slave-soldiers and guards continued to be used and even took high offices. This increasing level of influence among the Mamluks worried the Ayyubids in particular. Eventually, a Mamluk rose to become Sultan of Egypt. The Mamluks in medieval Egypt were predominantly of Turkic and Circassian origins, and most of them descended from enslaved Christians. After they were taken from their families, they became renegades. Because Egyptian Mamluks were enslaved Christians, Muslim rulers and clerics did not believe they were true believers of Islam despite the fact that they were deployed for fighting in wars on behalf of several Islamic kingdoms as slave-soldiers.

By 1200, Saladin's brother al-ʿĀdil succeeded in securing control over the whole empire by defeating and killing or imprisoning his brothers and nephews in turn. With each victory, al-ʿĀdil incorporated the defeated Mamluk retinue into his own. This process was repeated at al-ʿĀdil's death in 1218, and at his son al-Kāmil's death in 1238. The Ayyubids became increasingly surrounded by the Mamluks, who acted semi-autonomously as regional atabegs. The Mamluks increasingly became involved in the internal court politics of the kingdom itself as various factions used them as allies.

=== French attack and Mamluk takeover ===
In June 1249, the Seventh Crusade under Louis IX of France landed in Egypt and took Damietta. After the Egyptian troops retreated at first, the sultan had more than 50 commanders hanged as deserters.

When the Egyptian sultan as-Salih Ayyub died, the power passed briefly to his son al-Muazzam Turanshah and then his favorite wife Shajar al-Durr (a Turk according to most historians, while others say she was an Armenian). She took control with Mamluk support and launched a counterattack against the French. Troops of the Bahri commander Baibars defeated Louis's troops. The king delayed his retreat too long and was captured by the Mamluks in March 1250. He agreed to pay a ransom of 400,000 livres tournois to gain release (150,000 livres were never paid).

Because of political pressure for a male leader, Shajar married the Mamluk commander, Aybak. He was assassinated in his bath. In the ensuing power struggle, viceregent Qutuz, also a Mamluk, took over. He formally founded the Mamluk Sultanate and the Bahri mamluk dynasty.

The first Mamluk dynasty was named Bahri after the name of one of the regiments, the Bahriyyah or River Island regiment. Its name referred to their center on Rhoda Island in the Nile. The regiment consisted mainly of Kipchaks and Cumans.

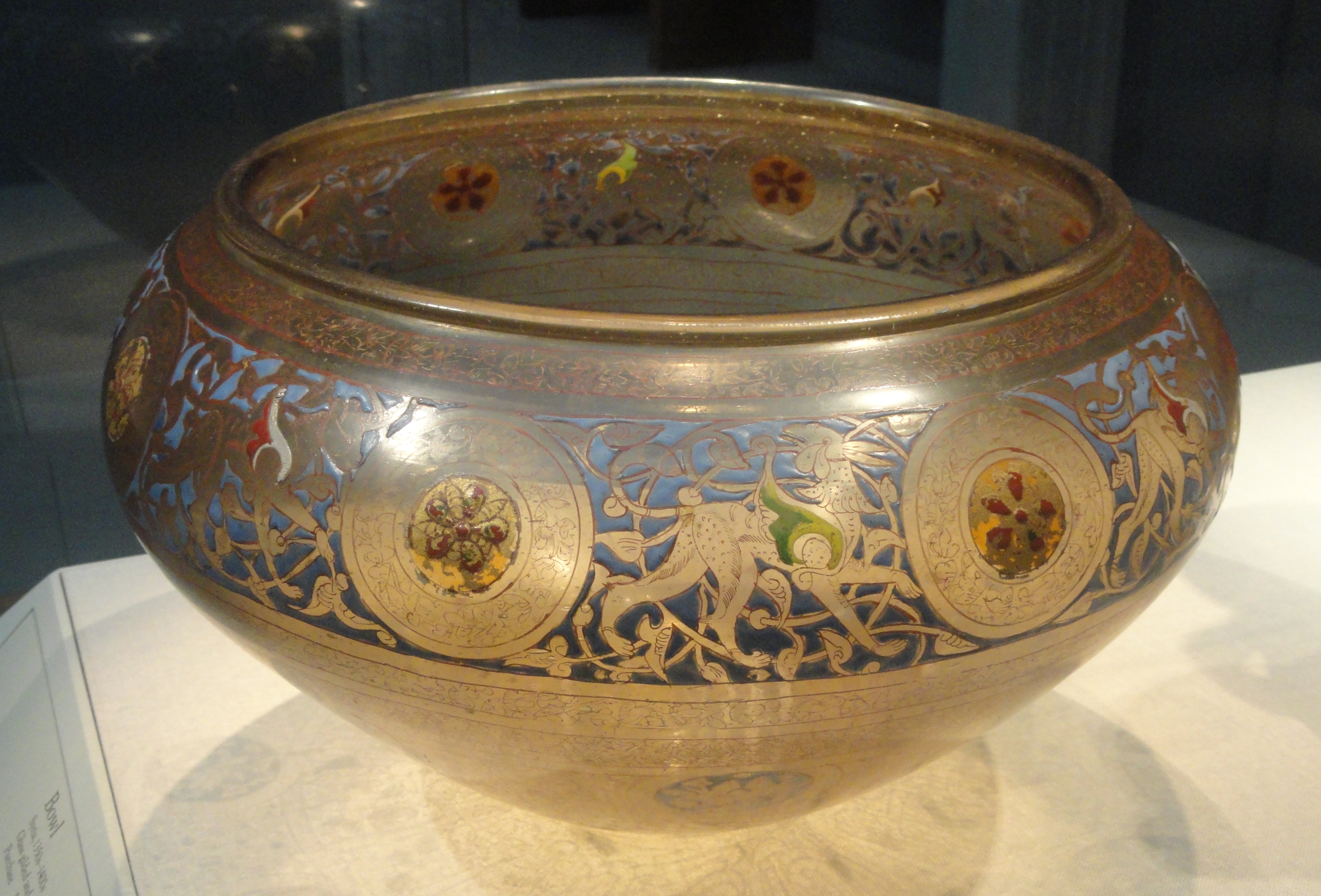
Mamluk-Syrian glassware vessel from the 14th century; in the course of trade, the middle vase shown ended up in Yemen and then China.

=== Relationship with the Mongols ===
When the Mongol Empire's troops of Hulagu Khan sacked Baghdad in 1258 and advanced towards Syria, the Mamluk emir Baibars left Damascus for Cairo. There he was welcomed by Sultan Qutuz. After taking Damascus, Hulagu demanded that Qutuz surrender Egypt. Qutuz had Hulagu's envoys killed and, with Baibars' help, mobilized his troops.

When Möngke Khan died in action against the Southern Song, Hulagu pulled the majority of his forces out of Syria to attend the kurultai (funeral ceremony). He left his lieutenant, the Christian Kitbuqa, in charge with a token force of about 18,000 men as a garrison. The Mamluk army, led by Qutuz, drew the reduced Ilkhanate army into an ambush near the Orontes River, routed them at the Battle of Ain Jalut in 1260, and captured and executed Kitbuqa.

After this great triumph, Qutuz was assassinated by conspiring Mamluks. It was widely said that Baibars, who seized power, had been involved in the assassination plot. In the following centuries, the Mamluks ruled discontinuously, with an average span of seven years.

The Mamluks defeated the Ilkhanids a second time in the First Battle of Homs and began to drive them back east. In the process they consolidated their power over Syria, fortified the area, and formed mail routes and diplomatic connections among the local princes. Baibars' troops attacked Acre in 1263, captured Caesarea in 1265, and took Antioch in 1268.

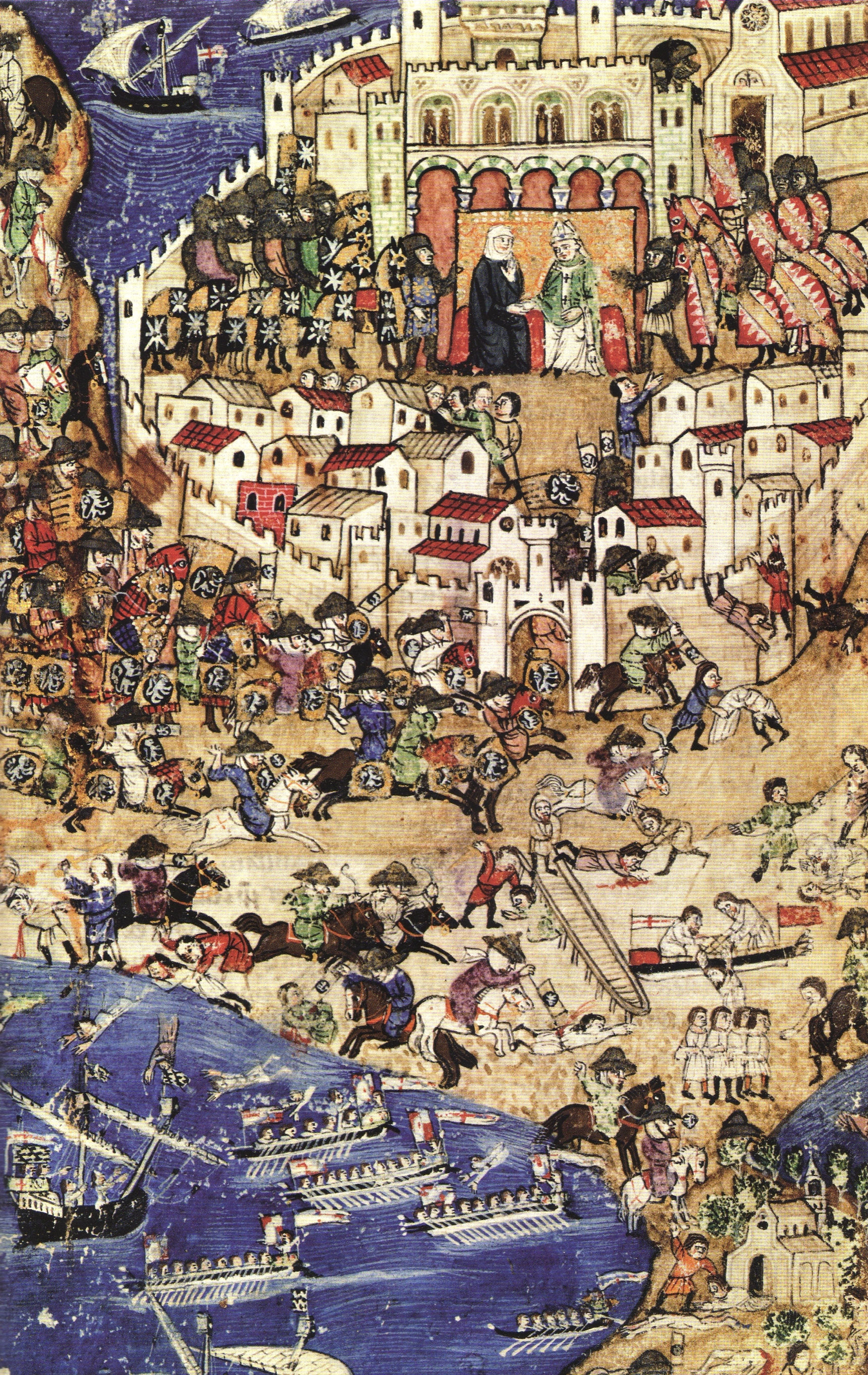
Mamluks attacking at the Fall of Tripoli in 1289

Mamluks also defeated new Ilkhanate attacks in Syria in 1271 and 1281 (the Second Battle of Homs). They were defeated by the Ilkhanids and their Christian allies at the Battle of Wadi al-Khazandar in 1299. Soon after that, the Mamluks defeated the Ilkhanate again in 1303/1304 and 1312. Finally, the Ilkhanids and the Mamluks signed a treaty of peace in 1323.

=== Burji dynasty ===
By the late fourteenth century, the majority of the Mamluk ranks were made up of Circassians from the North Caucasus region, whose young males had been frequently captured for slavery. In 1382 the Burji dynasty took over when Barquq was proclaimed sultan. The name "Burji" referred to their center at the citadel of Cairo.

Barquq became an enemy of Timur, who threatened to invade Syria. Timur invaded Syria, defeating the Mamluk army, and he sacked Aleppo and captured Damascus. The Ottoman sultan, Bayezid I, then invaded Syria. After Timur's death in 1405, the Mamluk sultan an-Nasir Faraj regained control of Syria. Frequently facing rebellions by local emirs, he was forced to abdicate in 1412. In 1421, Egypt was attacked by the Kingdom of Cyprus, but the Egyptians forced the Cypriotes to acknowledge the suzerainty of the Egyptian sultan Barsbay. During Barsbay's reign, Egypt's population became greatly reduced from what it had been a few centuries before; it had one-fifth the number of towns.

Al-Ashraf came to power in 1453. He had friendly relations with the Ottoman Empire, which captured Constantinople later that year, causing great rejoicings in Muslim Egypt. However, under the reign of Khushqadam, Egypt began a struggle with the Ottoman sultanate. In 1467, sultan Qaitbay offended the Ottoman sultan Bayezid II, whose brother was poisoned. Bayezid II seized Adana, Tarsus and other places within Egyptian territory, but was eventually defeated. Qaitbay also tried to help the Muslims in Spain, who were suffering after the Catholic Reconquista, by threatening the Christians in Syria, but he had little effect in Spain. He died in 1496, several hundred thousand ducats in debt to the great trading families of the Republic of Venice.

=== Portuguese–Mamluk Wars ===
In 1497, Vasco da Gama sailed around the Cape of Good Hope and pushed his way east across the Indian Ocean to the shores of Malabar and Kozhikode. There he attacked the fleets that carried freight and Muslim pilgrims from India to the Red Sea, and struck terror into the potentates all around. Various engagements took place. Cairo's Mamluk sultan Al-Ashraf Qansuh al-Ghawri was affronted at the attacks around the Red Sea, the loss of tolls and traffic, the indignities to which Mecca and its port were subjected, and above all, losing one of his ships. He vowed vengeance upon Portugal, first sending monks from the Church of the Holy Sepulchre as envoys. He threatened Pope Julius II that if he did not check Manuel I of Portugal in his depredations on the Indian Sea, he would destroy all Christian holy places.

The rulers of Gujarat in India and Yemen also turned to the Mamluk Sultan of Egypt for help. They wanted an armed fleet in the Red Sea that could protect their important trading sea routes from Portuguese attacks. Jeddah was soon fortified as a harbour of refuge so Arabia and the Red Sea were protected. However, the fleets in the Indian Ocean were still at the mercy of the enemy.

The last Mamluk sultan, Al-Ghawri, fitted out a fleet of 50 vessels. As Mamluks had little expertise in naval warfare, he sought help from the Ottomans to develop this naval enterprise. In 1508 at the Battle of Chaul, the Mamluk fleet defeated the Portuguese viceroy's son, Lourenço de Almeida.

In the following year, the Portuguese won the Battle of Diu and wrested the port city of Diu from the Gujarat Sultanate. Some years after, Afonso de Albuquerque attacked Aden, and Egyptian troops suffered disaster from the Portuguese in Yemen. Al-Ghawri fitted out a new fleet to punish the enemy and protect the Indian trade. Before it could exert much power, Egypt had lost its sovereignty. The Ottoman Empire took over Egypt and the Red Sea, together with Mecca and all its Arabian interests.

=== Ottomans and the end of the Mamluk Sultanate ===
The Ottoman Sultan Bayezid II was engaged in warfare in southern Europe when a new era of hostility with Egypt began in 1501. It arose out of the relations with the Safavid dynasty in Persia. Shah Ismail I sent an embassy to the Republic of Venice via Syria, inviting Venice to ally with Persia and recover its territory taken by the Ottomans. Mameluk Egyptian sultan Al-Ghawri was charged by Selim I with giving the Persian envoys passage through Syria on their way to Venice and harboring refugees. To appease him, Al-Ghawri placed in confinement the Venetian merchants then in Syria and Egypt, but after a year released them.

After the Battle of Chaldiran in 1514, Selim attacked the bey of Dulkadirids, as Egypt's vassal had stood aloof, and sent his head to Al-Ghawri. Now secure against Persia, in 1516 he formed a great army for the conquest of Egypt, but gave out that he intended further attacks on Persia.

In 1515, Selim began the war, which led to the conquest of Egypt and its dependencies. Mamluk cavalry proved no match for the Ottoman artillery and Janissary infantry. On 24 August 1516, at the Battle of Marj Dabiq, Sultan Al-Ghawri was killed. Syria passed into Turkish possession, an event welcomed in many places as it was seen as deliverance from the Mamluks.

The Mamluk Sultanate survived in Egypt until 1517, when Selim captured Cairo on 20 January. Although not in the same form as under the Sultanate, the Ottoman Empire retained the Mamluks as an Egyptian ruling class, and the Mamluks and the Burji family succeeded in regaining much of their influence, albeit as vassals of the Ottomans.

=== Independence from the Ottomans ===
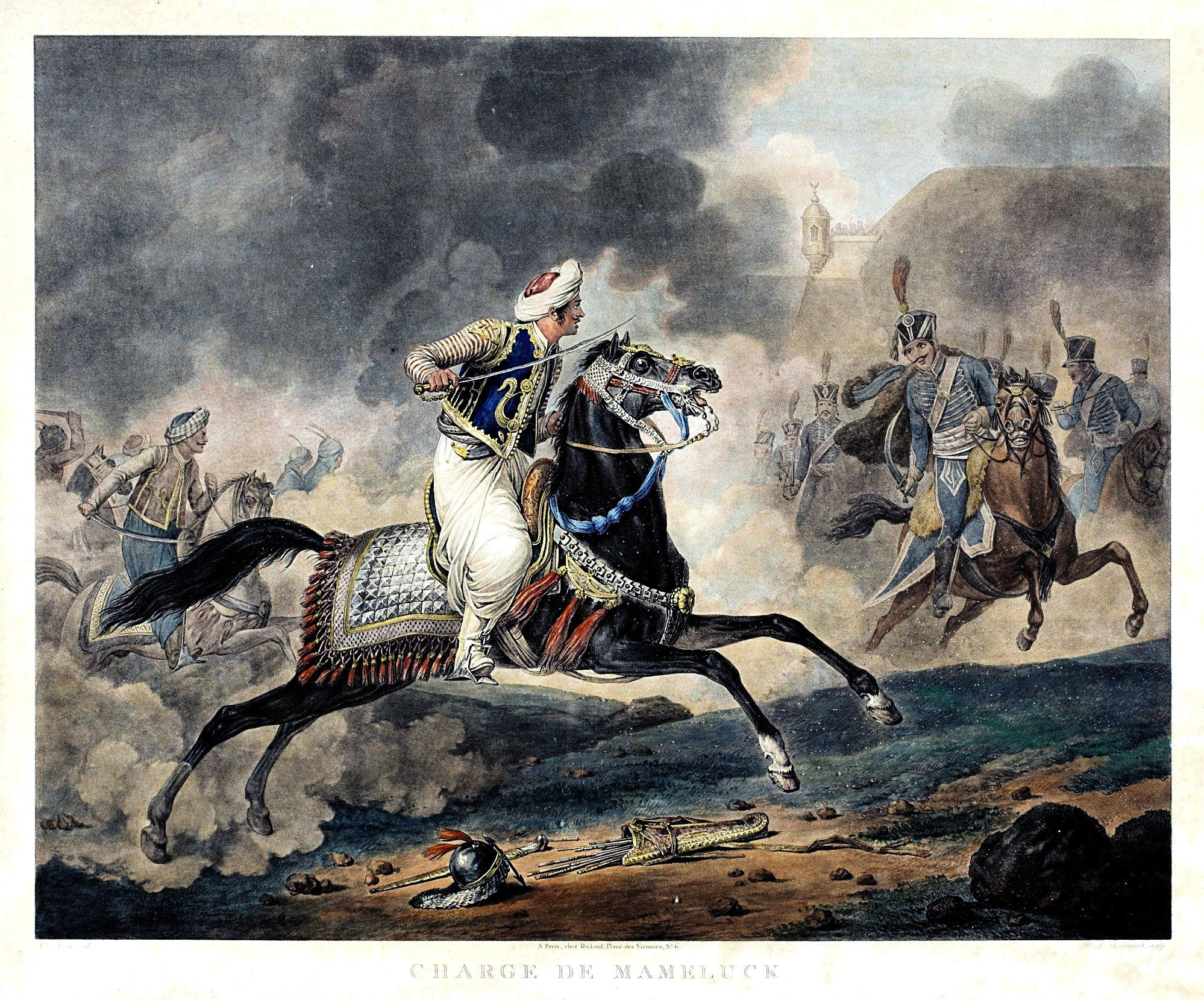
Charge of the Mamluk cavalry by Carle Vernet

In 1768, Ali Bey Al-Kabir declared independence from the Ottomans. However, the Ottomans crushed the movement and retained their position after his defeat. By this time new slave recruits were introduced from Georgia in the Caucasus.

==== Napoleon invades ====
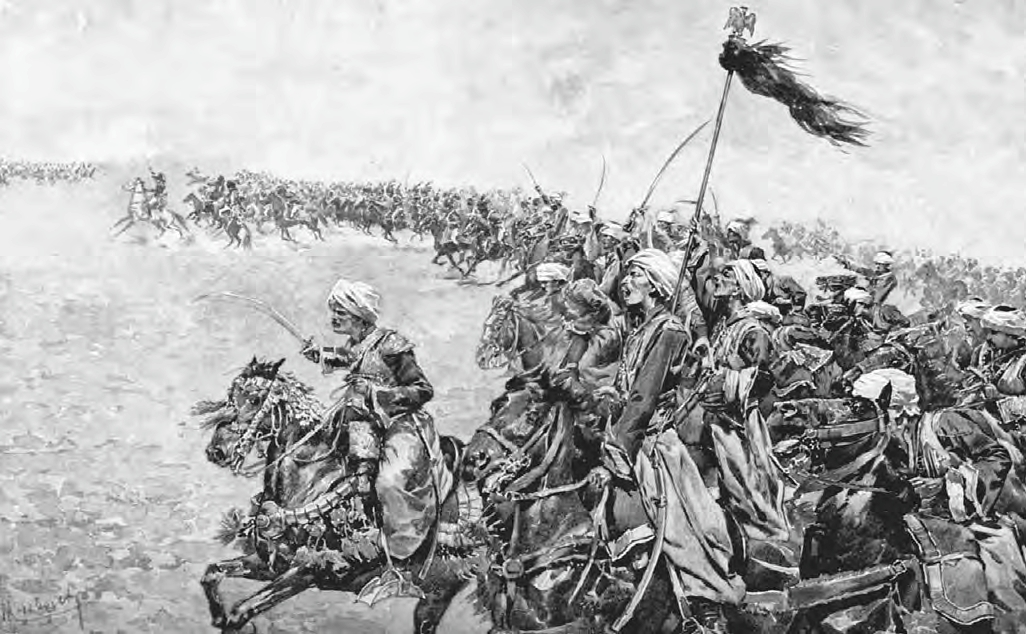
Charge of the Mamluks during the Battle of Austerlitz by Felician Myrbach. An elite body of cavalry whom the French encountered during their campaign in Egypt in 1798, the Mamluks could trace their lineage of service to the Ottomans back to the mid-13th century.

In 1798, the ruling Directory of the Republic of France authorised a campaign in "The Orient" to protect French trade interests and undermine Britain's access to India. To this end, Napoleon Bonaparte led an Armée d'Orient to Egypt.

The French defeated a Mamluk army in the Battle of the Pyramids and drove the survivors out to Upper Egypt. The Mamluks relied on massed cavalry charges, changed only by the addition of muskets. The French infantry formed square and held firm. Despite multiple victories and an initially successful expedition into Syria, mounting conflict in Europe and the earlier defeat of the supporting French fleet by the British Royal Navy at the Battle of the Nile decided the issue.

On 14 September 1799, General Jean-Baptiste Kléber established a mounted company of Mamluk auxiliaries and Syrian Janissaries from Turkish troops captured at the siege of Acre. Menou reorganized the company on 7 July 1800, forming three companies of 100 men each and renaming it the "Mamluks de la République". In 1801 General Jean Rapp was sent to Marseille to organize a squadron of 250 Mamluks. On 7 January 1802 the previous order was canceled and the squadron reduced to 150 men. The list of effectives on 21 April 1802 reveals three officers and 155 of other rank. By decree of 25 December 1803 the Mamluks were organized into a company attached to the Chasseurs-à-Cheval of the Imperial Guard (see Mamelukes of the Imperial Guard).

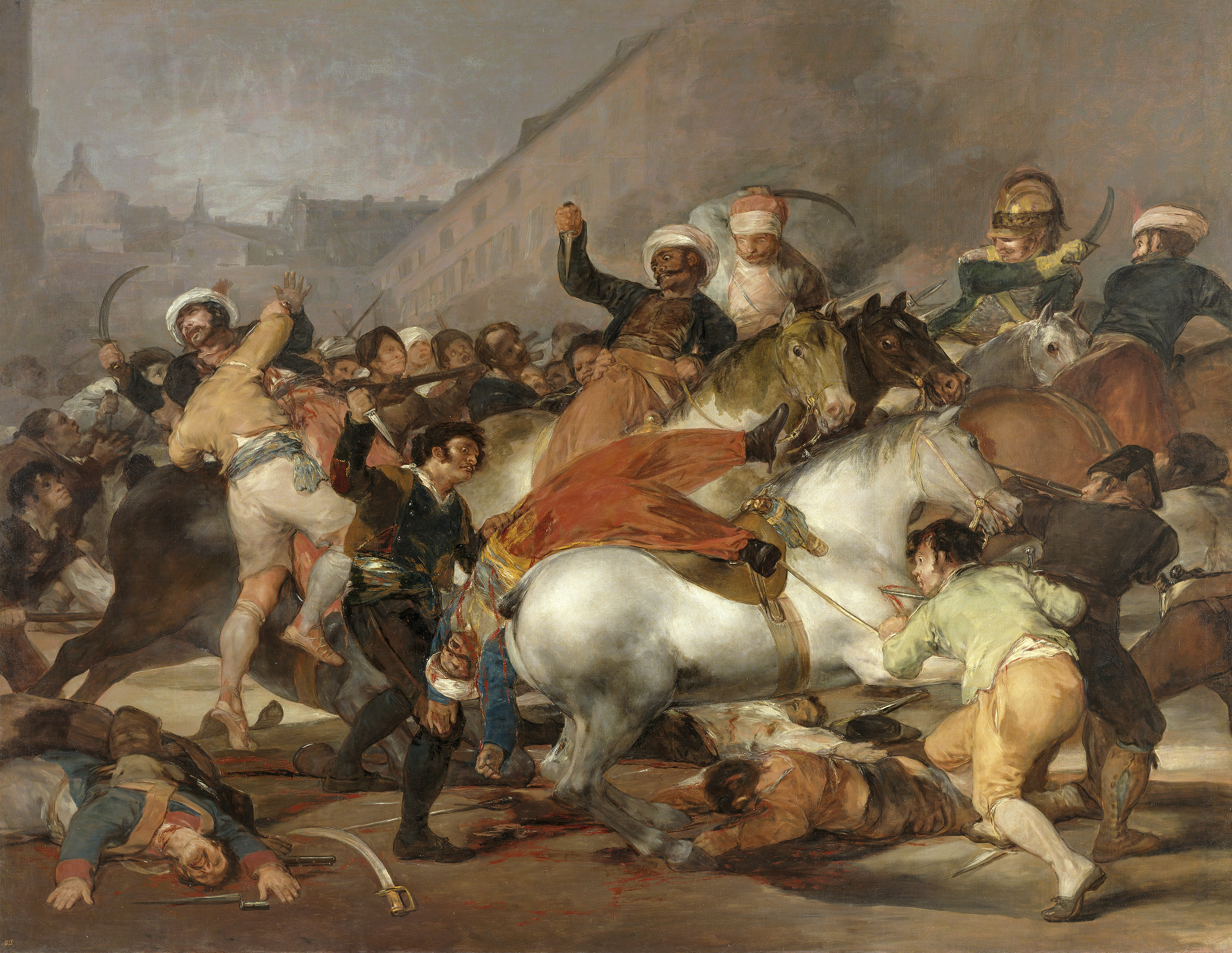
The Second of May 1808: the charge of the Mamelukes of the Imperial Guard in Madrid, by Francisco de Goya

Napoleon left with his personal guard in late 1799. His successor in Egypt, General Jean-Baptiste Kléber, was assassinated on 14 June 1800. Command of the Army in Egypt fell to Jacques-François Menou. Isolated and out of supplies, Menou surrendered to the British in 1801.

=== After Napoleon ===
After the departure of French troops in 1801, the Mamluks continued their struggle for independence; this time against the Ottoman Empire. In 1803, Mamluk leaders Ibrahim Bey and Osman Bey al-Bardisi wrote to the Russian consul-general, asking him to mediate with the Sultan to allow them to negotiate for a cease-fire, and a return to their homeland, Georgia. The Russian ambassador in Constantinople refused, however, to intervene, because of nationalist unrest in Georgia that might have been encouraged by a Mamluk return.

In 1805, the population of Cairo rebelled. This provided a chance for the Mamluks to seize power, but internal friction prevented them from exploiting this opportunity. In 1806, the Mamluks defeated the Turkish forces in several clashes. In June, the rival parties concluded an agreement by which Muhammad Ali, (appointed as governor of Egypt on 26 March 1806), was to be removed and authority returned to the Mamluks. However, they were again unable to capitalize on this opportunity due to discord between factions. Muhammad Ali retained his authority.

=== End of power in Egypt ===
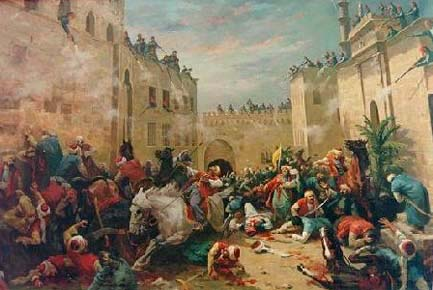
Massacre of the Mamelukes at the Cairo citadel in 1811.

Massacre of the Mamelukes by Horace Vernet, 1819

Muhammad Ali knew that he would have to deal with the Mamluks if he wanted to control Egypt. They were still the feudal owners of Egypt, and their land was still the source of wealth and power. However, the economic strain of sustaining the military manpower necessary to defend the Mamluks's system from the Europeans and Turks would eventually weaken them to the point of collapse.

On 1 March 1811, Muhammad Ali invited all of the leading Mamluks to his palace to celebrate the declaration of war against the Wahhabis in Arabia. Between 600 and 700 Mamluks paraded for this purpose in Cairo. Muhammad Ali's forces killed almost all of these near the Al-Azab gates in a narrow road down from Mukatam Hill. This ambush came to be known as the Massacre of the Citadel. According to contemporary reports, only one Mamluk, whose name is given variously as Amim (also Amyn), or Heshjukur (a Besleney), survived when he forced his horse to leap from the walls of the citadel.

During the following week, an estimated 3,000 Mamluks and their relatives were killed throughout Egypt by Muhammad's regular troops. In the citadel of Cairo alone, more than 1,000 Mamluks died.

Despite Muhammad Ali's destruction of the Mamluks in Egypt, a party of them escaped and fled south into what is now Sudan. In 1811, these Mamluks established a state at Dunqulah in the Sennar as a base for their slave trading. In 1820, the sultan of Sennar informed Muhammad Ali that he was unable to comply with a demand to expel the Mamluks. In response, the Pasha sent 4,000 troops to invade Sudan, clear it of Mamluks, and reclaim it for Egypt. The Pasha's forces received the submission of the Kashif, dispersed the Dunqulah Mamluks, conquered Kordofan, and accepted Sennar's surrender from the last Funj sultan, Badi VII.

== Impact ==
According to Eric Chaney and Lisa Blaydes, the reliance on mamluks by Muslim rulers had a profound impact on the Arab world's political development. They argue that, because European rulers had to rely on local elites for military forces, lords and the bourgeoisie acquired the necessary bargaining power to push for representative government. Muslim rulers did not face the same pressures partly because the Mamluks allowed the Sultans to bypass local elites.

== Other regimes ==
There were various places in which Mamluks gained political or military power as a self-replicating military community. Some examples of this can be seen in the Tripolitania region of Libya, where Mamluk governors instated their various policies under the Ottoman Empire until October 18, 1912, when Italian forces took over the region in the Italo-Turkish War.

=== South Asia ===
==== India ====
In 1206, the Mamluk commander of the Muslim forces in the Indian subcontinent, Qutb al-Din Aibak, proclaimed himself Sultan, creating the Mamluk Sultanate in Delhi which lasted until 1290.

=== West Asia ===
==== Iraq ====
Mamluk corps were first introduced in Iraq by Hassan Pasha of Baghdad in 1702. From 1747 to 1831 Iraq was ruled, with short intermissions, by Mamluk officers of Georgian origin who succeeded in asserting autonomy from the Sublime Porte, suppressed tribal revolts, curbed the power of the Janissaries, restored order, and introduced a program of modernization of the economy and the military. In 1831 the Ottomans overthrew Dawud Pasha, the last Mamluk ruler, and imposed direct control over Iraq.

== Rulers ==
=== In Egypt ===
==== Bahri Dynasty ====
- 1250 Shajar al-Durr (al-Salih Ayyub's Widow de facto ruler of Egypt)
- 1250 Aybak
- 1257 Al-Mansur Ali
- 1259 Qutuz
- 1260 Baibars
- 1277 Al-Said Barakah
- 1280 Solamish
- 1280 Qalawun
- 1290 al-Ashraf Salah-ad-Din Khalil
- 1294 al-Nasir Muhammad first reign
- 1295 al-Adil Kitbugha
- 1297 Lajin
- 1299 al-Nasir Muhammad second reign
- 1309 al-Muzaffar Rukn-ad-Din Baybars II al-Jashankir
- 1310 al-Nasir Muhammad third reign
- 1340 Saif ad-Din Abu-Bakr
- 1341 Kujuk
- 1342 An-Nasir Ahmad, Sultan of Egypt
- 1342 As-Salih Ismail, Sultan of Egypt
- 1345 Al-Kamil Sha'ban
- 1346 Al-Muzaffar Hajji
- 1347 al-Nasir Badr-ad-Din Abu al-Ma'aly al-Hassan first reign
- 1351 al-Salih Salah-ad-Din Ibn Muhammad
- 1354 al-Nasir Badr-ad-Din Abu al-Ma'aly al-Hassan second reign
- 1361 al-Mansur Salah-ad-Din Mohamed Ibn Hajji
- 1363 al-Ashraf Zein al-Din Abu al-Ma'ali ibn Shaban
- 1376 al-Mansur Ala-ad-Din Ali Ibn al-Ashraf Shaban
- 1382 al-Salih Salah Zein al-Din Hajji II first reign

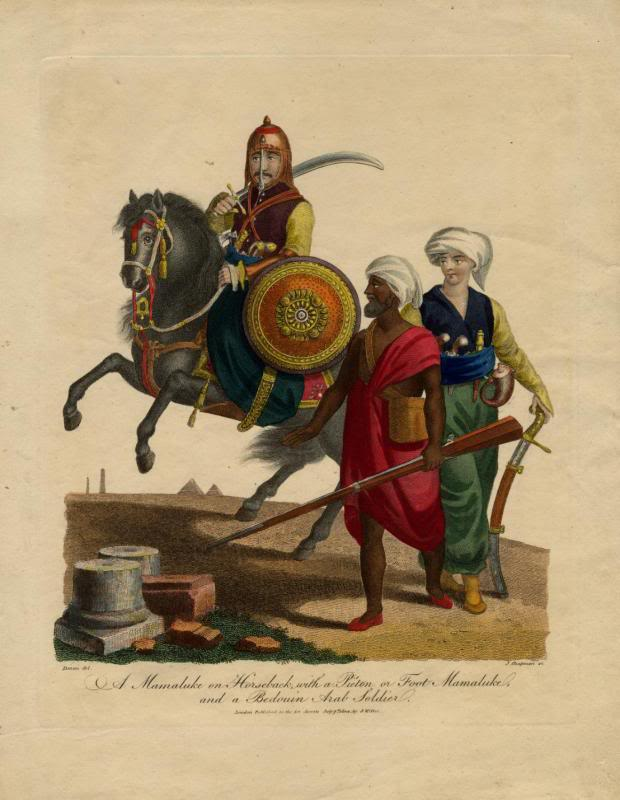
A Mamluk on horseback, with a Piéton or foot-soldier mamluk and a Bedouin soldier, 1804

==== Burji Dynasty ====
- 1382 Barquq first reign
- 1389 Hajji II second reign (with honorific title al-Muzaffar or al-Mansur) – Temporary Bahri rule
- 1390 Barquq second reign – Burji rule re-established
- 1399 An-Nasir Naseer ad-Din Faraj first reign
- 1405 Al-Mansoor Azzaddin Abdal Aziz
- 1405 An-Nasir Naseer ad-Din Faraj second reign
- 1412 al-Musta'in (Abbasid Caliph, proclaimed as Sultan)
- 1412 Al-Muayad Sayf ad-Din Shaykh
- 1421 Al-Muzaffar Ahmad
- 1421 Az-Zahir Saif ad-Din Tatar
- 1421 As-Salih Nasir ad-Din Muhammad
- 1422 Barsbay
- 1438 Al-Aziz Jamal ad-Din Yusuf
- 1438 Jaqmaq
- 1453 Al-Mansoor Fakhr ad-Din Osman
- 1453 Al-Ashraf Sayf ad-Din Enal
- 1461 Al-Muayad Shihab ad-Din Ahmad
- 1461 Az-Zahir Sayf ad-Din Khushkadam
- 1467 Az-Zahir Sayf ad-Din Bilbay
- 1468 Az-Zahir Temurbougha
- 1468 Qaitbay
- 1496 al-Nasir Abu al-Sa'adat Muhammad bin Qait Bay first reign
- 1497 Qansuh Khumsama'ah
- 1497 al-Nasir Abu al-Sa'adat Muhammad bin Qait Bay second reign
- 1498 Qansuh Al-Ashrafi
- 1500 Al-Bilal Ayub
- 1500 Al-Ashraf Janbalat
- 1501 Tuman bay I
- 1501 Al-Ashraf Qansuh al-Ghawri
- 1517 Tuman bay II

=== In India ===
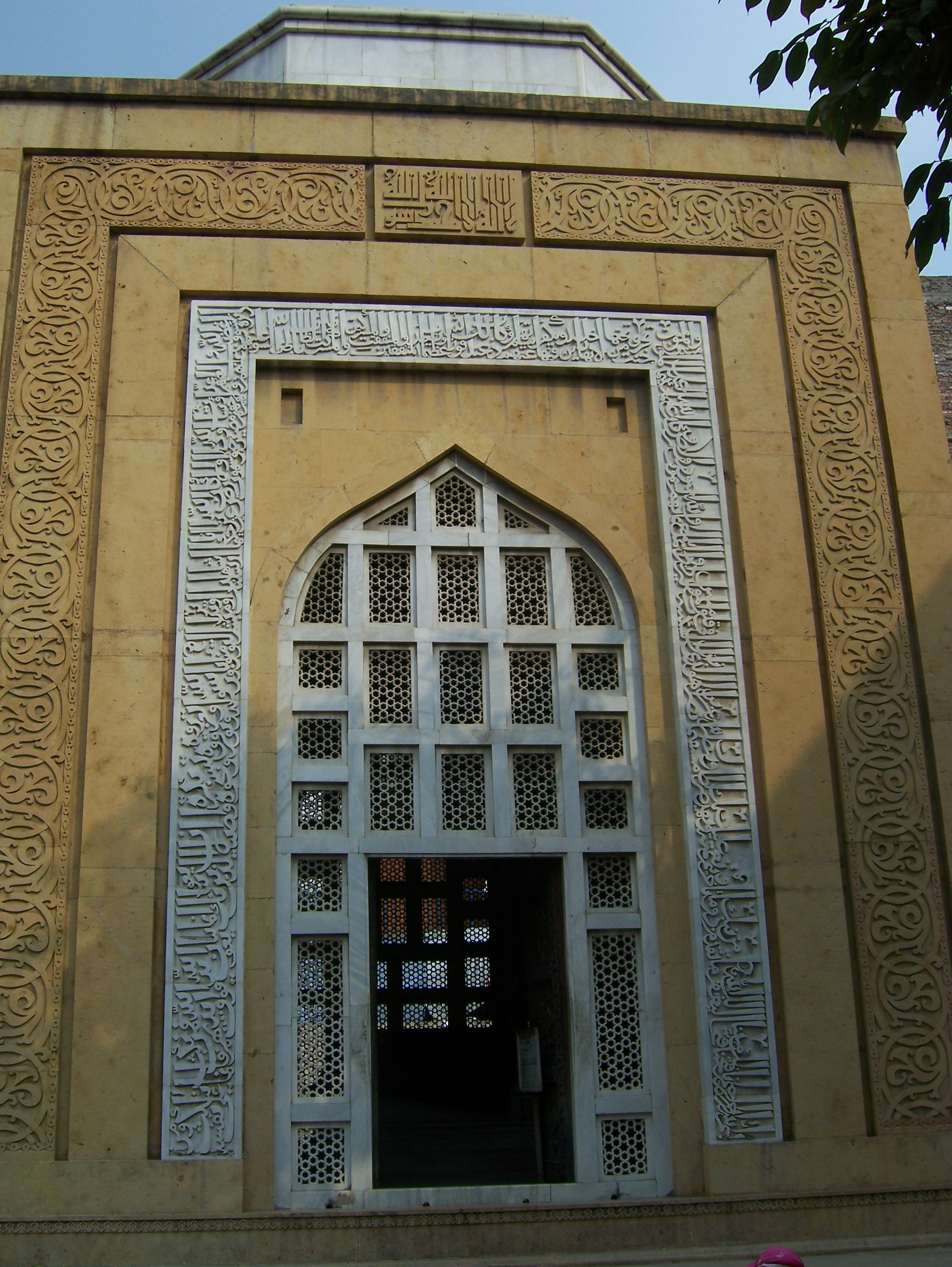
The mausoleum of Qutb al-Din Aibak in Anarkali, Lahore, Pakistan.

- 1206 Qutb-ud-din Aybak, founded Mamluk Sultanate, Delhi
- 1210 Aram Shah
- 1211 Shams ud din Iltutmish, son-in-law of Qutb-ud-din Aybak
- 1236 Rukn ud din Firuz, son of Iltutmish
- 1236 Razia Sultana, daughter of Iltutmish
- 1240 Muiz ud din Bahram, son of Iltutmish
- 1242 Ala ud din Masud, son of Rukn ud din Firuz
- 1246 Nasiruddin Mahmud, grandson of Iltutmish
- 1266 Ghiyas ud din Balban, ex-slave and son-in-law of Iltutmish
- 1286 Muiz ud din Qaiqabad, grandson of Balban and Nasiruddin
- 1290 Kayumars, son of Muiz ud din

=== In Iraq ===
- 1704 Hassan Pasha
- 1723 Ahmad Pasha, son of Hasan
- 1749 Sulayman Abu Layla Pasha, son-in-law of Ahmad
- 1762 Omar Pasha, son of Ahmad
- 1780 Sulayman Pasha the Great, son of Omar
- 1802 Ali Pasha, son of Omar
- 1807 Sulayman Pasha the Little, son of Sulayman the Great
- 1813 Said Pasha, son of Sulayman the Great
- 1816 Dawud Pasha (1816–1831)

=== In Acre ===
- 1805 Sulayman Pasha al-Adil, mamluk of Jezzar Pasha
- 1819 Abdullah Pasha ibn Ali (1819–1831)

== Office titles and terminology ==
The following terms originally come from either Turkish or Ottoman Turkish language (the latter composed of Turkish, Arabic, and Persian words and grammar structures).

| English | Arabic | Notes |
|---|---|---|
| Alama Sultaniya | علامة سلطانية | The mark or signature of the Sultan put on his decrees, letters and documents. |
| Al-Nafir al-Am | النفير العام | General emergency declared during war |
| Amir | أمير | Prince |
| Amir Akhur | أمير آخور | supervisor of the royal stable (from Persian آخور meaning stable) |
| Amir Majlis | أمير مجلس | Guard of Sultan's seat and bed |
| Atabek | أتابك | Commander in chief (literally "father-lord," originally meaning an appointed step-father for a non-Mamluk minor prince) |
| Astadar | أستادار | Chief of the royal servants |
| Barid Jawi | بريد جوى | Airmail (mail sent by carrier-pigeons, amplified by Sultan Baibars) |
| Bayt al-Mal | بيت المال | treasury |
| Cheshmeh | ششمه | A pool of water, or fountain (literally "eye"), from Persian چشمه |
| Dawadar | دوادار | Holder of Sultan's ink bottle (from Persian دوات‌دار meaning bearer of the ink bottle) |
| Fondok | فندق | Hotel (some famous hotels in Cairo during the Mamluk era were Dar al-Tofah, Fondok Bilal and Fondok al-Salih) |
| Hajib | حاجب | Doorkeeper of sultan's court |
| Iqta | إقطاع | Revenue from land allotment |
| Jamkiya | جامكية | Salary paid to a Mamluk |
| Jashnakir | جاشنكير | Food taster of the sultan (to assure his beer was not poisoned) |
| Jomdar | جمدار | An official at the department of the Sultan's clothing (from Persian جامه‌دار, meaning keeper of cloths) |
| Kafel al-mamalek al-sharifah al-islamiya al-amir al-amri | كافل الممالك الشريفة الاسلامية الأمير الأمرى | Title of the Vice-sultan (Guardian of the Prince of Command [lit. Commander-in-command] of the Dignified Islamic Kingdoms) |
| Khan | خان | A store that specialized in selling a certain commodity |
| Khaskiya | خاصكية | Courtiers of the sultan and most trusted royal mamluks who functioned as the Sultan's bodyguards/ A privileged group around a prominent Amir (from Persian خاصگیان, meaning close associates) |
| Khastakhaneh | خاصتاخانة | Hospital (from Ottoman Turkish خسته‌خانه, from Persian) |
| Khond | خند | Wife of the sultan |
| Khushdashiya | خشداشية | Mamluks belonging to the same Amir or Sultan. |
| Mahkamat al-Mazalim | محكمة المظالم | Court of complaint. A court that heard cases of complaints of people against state officials. This court was headed by the sultan himself. |
| Mamalik Kitabeya | مماليك كتابية | Mamluks still attending training classes and who still live at the Tebaq (campus) |
| Mamalik Sultaneya | مماليك سلطانية | Mamluks of the sultan; to distinguish from the Mamluks of the Amirs (princes) |
| Modwarat al-Sultan | مدورة السلطان | Sultan's tent which he used during travel. |
| Mohtaseb | محتسب | Controller of markets, public works and local affairs. |
| Morqadar | مرقدار | Works in the Royal Kitchen (from Persian مرغ‌دار meaning one responsible for the fowl) |
| Mushrif | مشرف | Supervisor of the Royal Kitchen |
| Na'ib Al-Sultan | نائب السلطان | Vice-sultan |
| Qa'at al-insha'a | قاعة الإنشاء | Chancery hall |
| Qadi al-Qoda | قاضى القضاة | Chief justice |
| Qalat al-Jabal | قلعة الجبل | Citadel of the Mountain (the abode and court of the sultan in Cairo) |
| Qaranisa | قرانصة | Mamluks who moved to the service of a new Sultan or from the service of an Amir to a sultan. |
| Qussad | قصاد | Secret couriers and agents who kept the sultan informed |
| Ostaz | أستاذ | Benefactor of Mamluks (the Sultan or the Emir) (from Persian استاد) |
| Rank | رنك | An emblem that distinguished the rank and position of a Mamluk (probably from Persian رنگ meaning color) |
| Sanjaqi | سنجاقى | A standard-bearer of the Sultan. |
| Sharabkhana | شرابخانة | Storehouse for drinks, medicines and glass-wares of the sultan. (from Persian شراب‌خانه meaning wine cellar) |
| Silihdar | سلحدار | Arm-Bearer (from Arabic سلاح + Persian دار, meaning arm-bearer) |
| Tabalkhana | طبلخانه | The amir responsible for the Mamluk military band, from Persian طبل‌خانه |
| Tashrif | تشريف | Head-covering worn by a Mamluk during the ceremony of inauguration to the position of Amir. |
| Tawashi | طواشى | A Eunuch responsible for serving the wives of the sultan and supervising new Mamluks. Mamluk writers seem not to have consulted the eunuchs themselves about "their origins." |
| Tebaq | طباق | Campus of the Mamluks at the citadel of the mountain |
| Tishtkhana | طشتخانة | Storehouse used for the laundry of the sultan (from Persian تشت‌خانه, meaning tub room) |
| Wali | والى | viceroy |
| Yuq | يوق | A large linen closet used in every mamluk home, which stored pillows and sheets. (Related to the present Crimean Tatar word Yuqa, "to sleep". In modern Turkish: Yüklük.) |

== Gallery ==
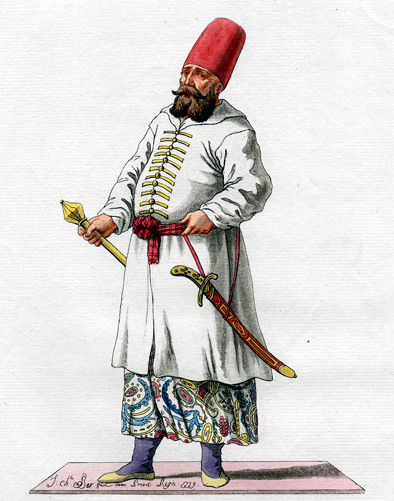
Portrait of a Mamluk, 1779

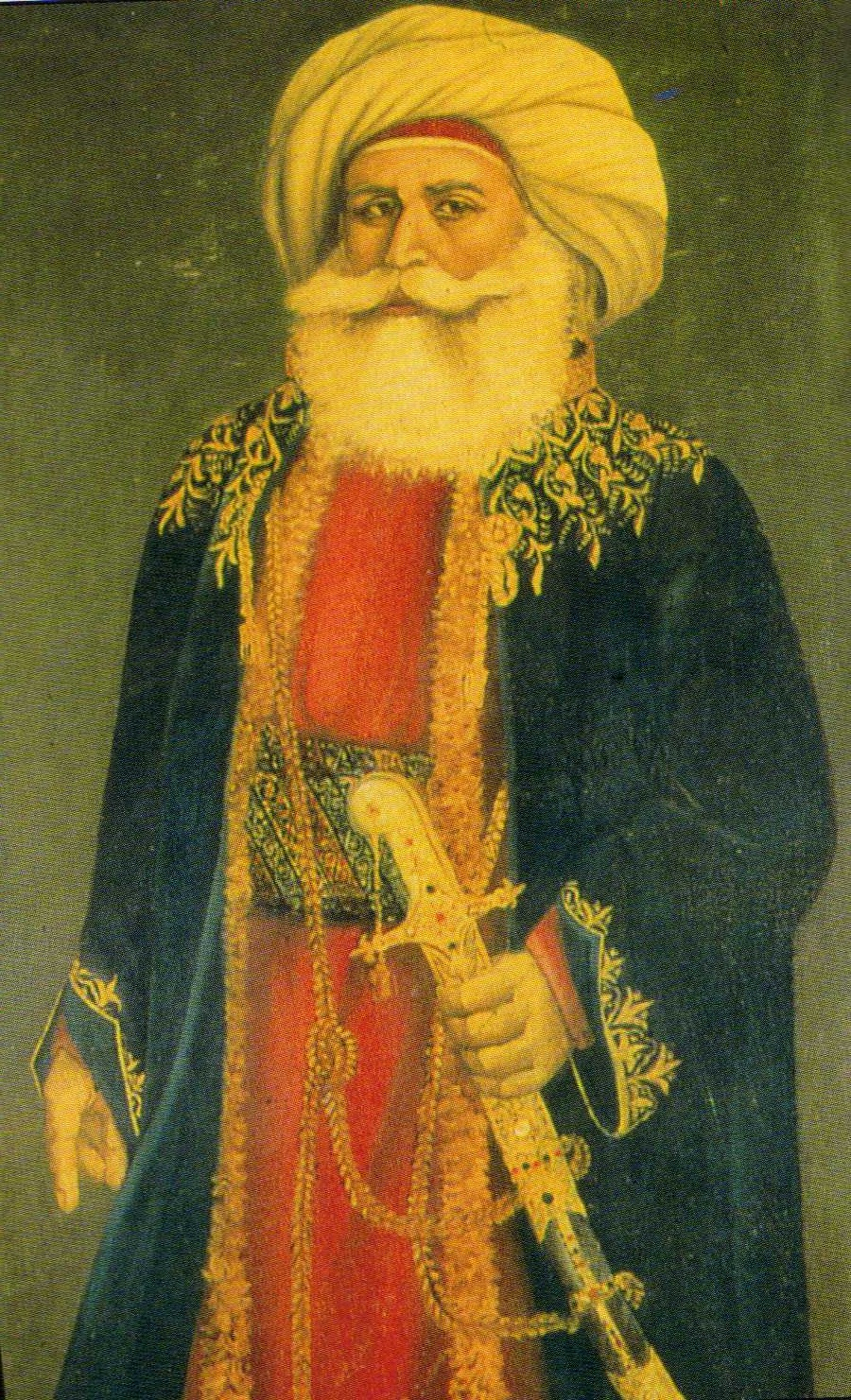
Murad Bey, Circassian Mamluk chieftain and cavalry commander, 1800

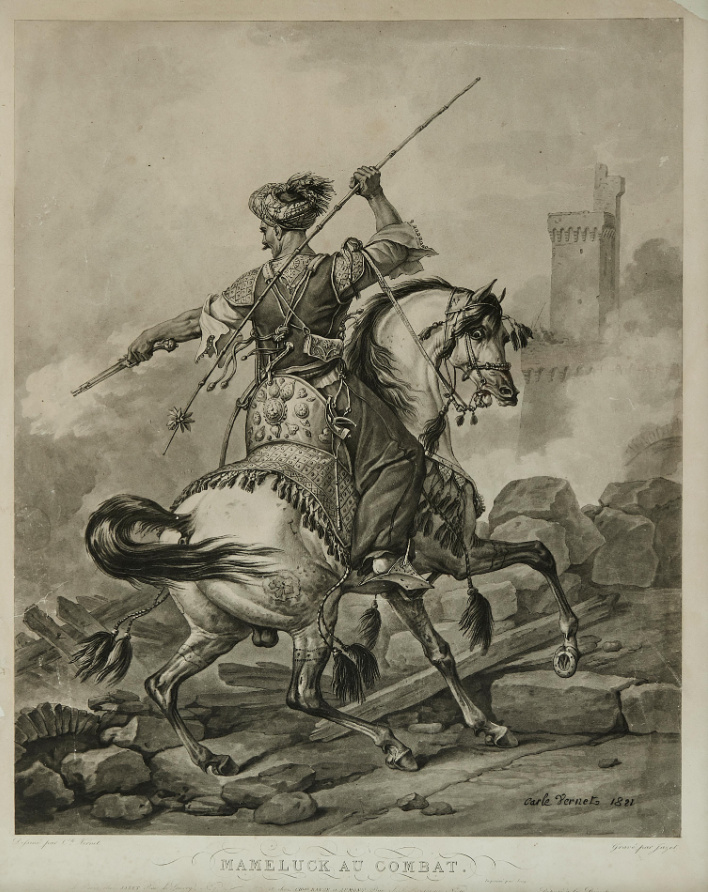
A Mamluk cavalryman, drawing by Carle Vernet, 1810

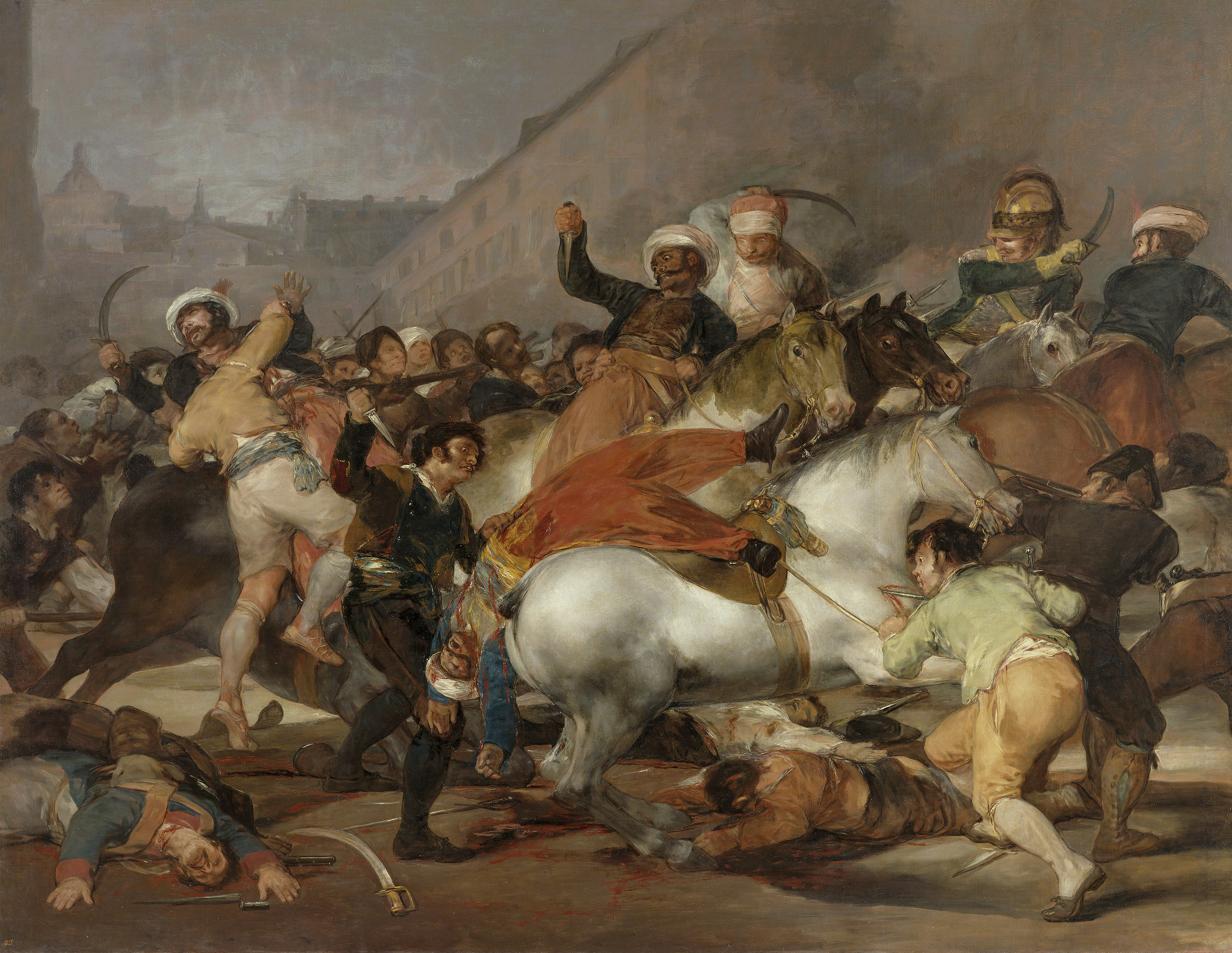
The Second of May 1808: The Charge of the Mamluks by Francisco de Goya (1814)

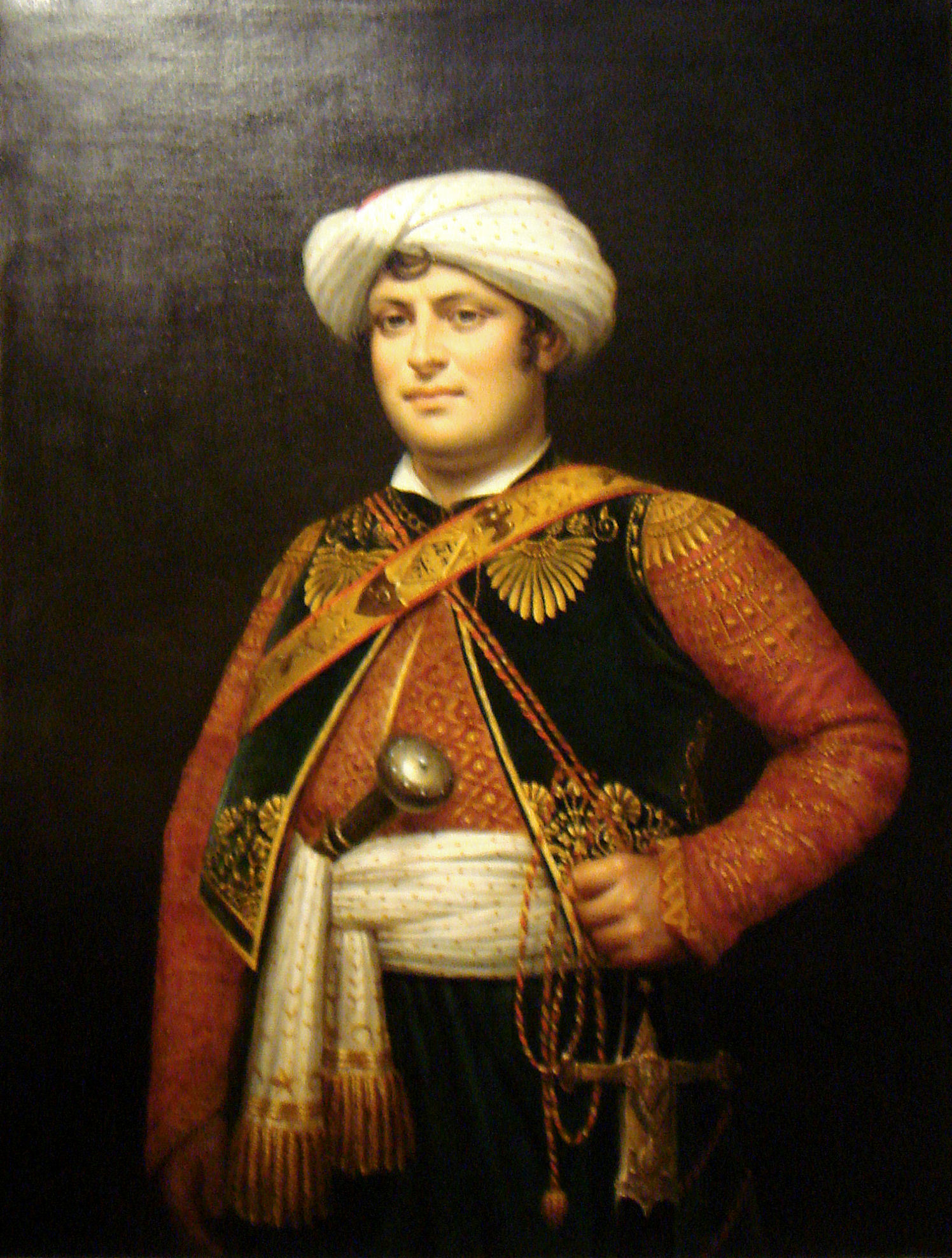
Armenian Mamluk Roustam Raza was Napoleon's personal bodyguard; portrait by Jacques-Nicolas Paillot de Montabert (1806)

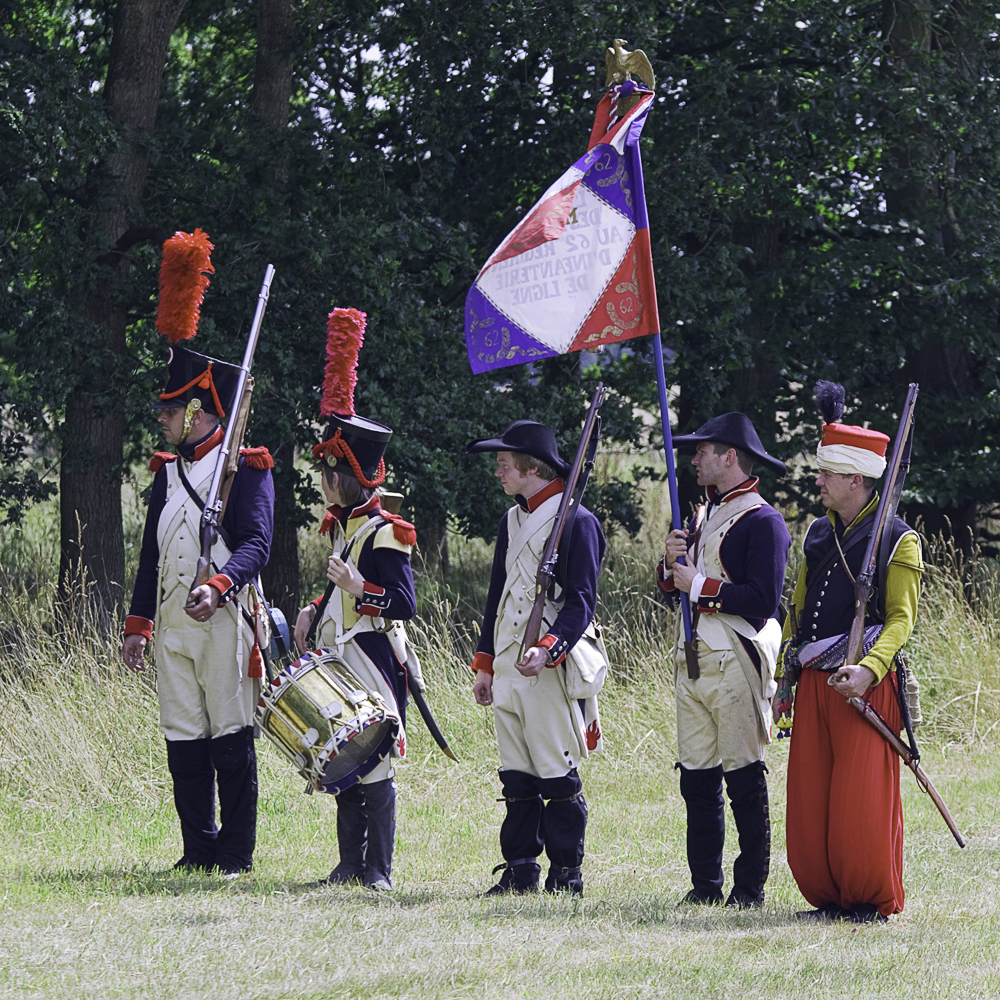
Soldiers of Napoleon's 62ème régiment de ligne and a Mamluk (historical reenactment)

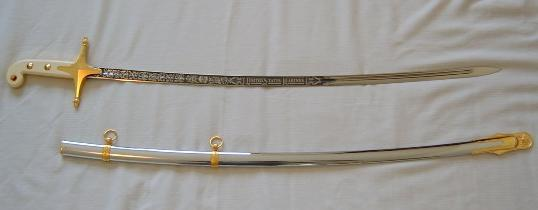
Today's U.S. Marine Corps officers' Mameluke sword resembles those used by the Mamluks

== Dynasties founded by Mamluks ==
- Tulunids (868–905)
- Ikhshidids (935–969)
- Ghaznavids (977–1186)
- Khwarazmian dynasty (1077–1231)
- Mamluk dynasty (Delhi) (1206–1290)
- Mamluk Sultanate (1250–1517)
  - Bahri dynasty (1250–1382)
  - Burji dynasty (1382–1517)
- Mamluk dynasty (Iraq) (1704–1831)

== See also ==
- Black Guard
- Janissary
- Jerusalem in the Mamluk period
- Mamluk carpets
- Mamluk architecture
- Mamelukes of the Imperial Guard
- Saqaliba
- Sultan of Egypt
- Simjurids
