= Said Pasha of Baghdad =

Said Pasha (Arabic: سعيد باشا, Georgian: საიდ ფაშა) was the Mamluk ruler of Iraq between 1813 and 1816. He was a son of Sulayman the Great, and was succeeded by Dawud Pasha.

== See also ==
- Mamluk dynasty of Iraq
