= Mamluk carpets =

15th–16th-century style of Middle Eastern carpet

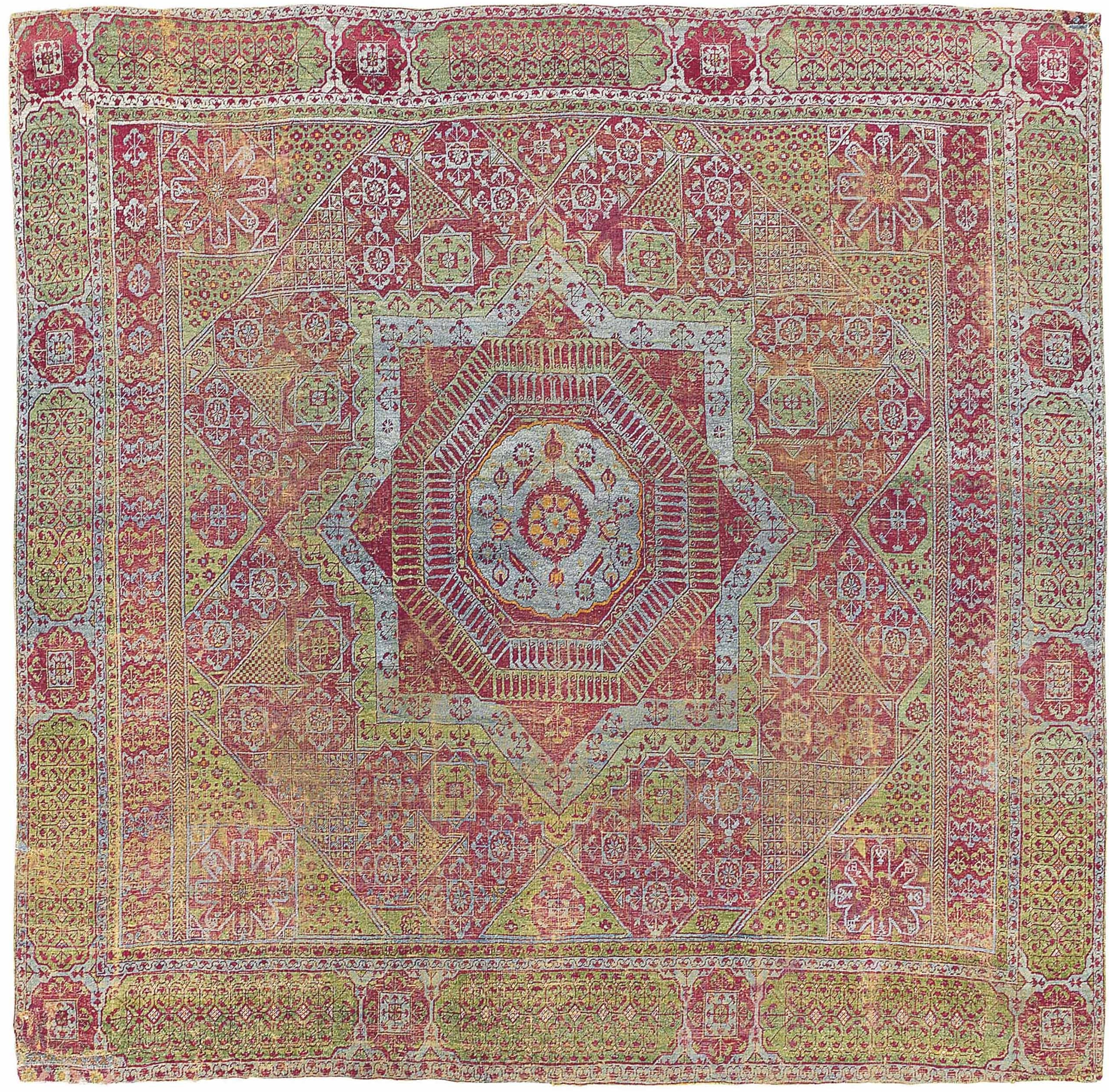
The Baillet-Latour Mamluk Carpet

Many studies have been conducted on Mamluk carpets, but scholars have not come to a consensus as to when or where they were made. Production of surviving Mamluk carpets started from the second half of the fifteenth century until the middle of the sixteenth century, and continued even after the Ottoman conquest of Egypt in 1517. The group of carpets produced in this period were initially called "Damascene" carpets after their attribution to Damascus, Syria. However, a Cairene origin was established after some fragments of carpets in this style were unearthed in Fustat. Furthermore, there are several eyewitness accounts by travelers placing a center of carpet production in Cairo.

== Location ==
The earliest record of rug weaving under the Mamluks is by the Venetian traveler Giosafat Barbaro, made during his visit to Tabriz in 1474 when he noted that the quality of carpets produced in Tabriz were superior to those produced in Cairo. The French traveler Jean de Thévenot visited Cairo in 1663, after the Ottoman conquest, and stated seeing weavers producing carpets. An account by the historian al-Maqrizi, cited by way of Suriano, he describes the sacking of the Mamluk Amir Sayf al-Din Qawsun al-Nasiri’s palace in 1341 as follows:

“Amongst the furnishings carried off were carpets (busut) from Amid (Diyarbekir) and Rum (Anatolia), and 16 pairs of Carpets ‘min ‘amal al-sharif bi Misr’ [made by al-sharif in Egypt]”

Regardless of whether “min ‘amal al-sharif” refers to a maker known as al-Sharif or means of noble or royal Egyptian production, “bi Misr” (in Egypt) means the rugs were Cairene (or rather Egyptian). The carpet fragments found in Fustat as well as the several accounts by travelers and the historian undoubtedly place a center of carpet production in Cairo.

== Function ==
Mamluk carpets were used domestically as well as imported. Domestically, this new form of interior decoration was made for both religious and residential structures. During processions, these carpets were also used to line the streets; one account notes that during one of the Mamluk parades, Sultan Barquq had to throw coins to distract people who were attempting to steal the carpets lined up for his procession.

== Features ==
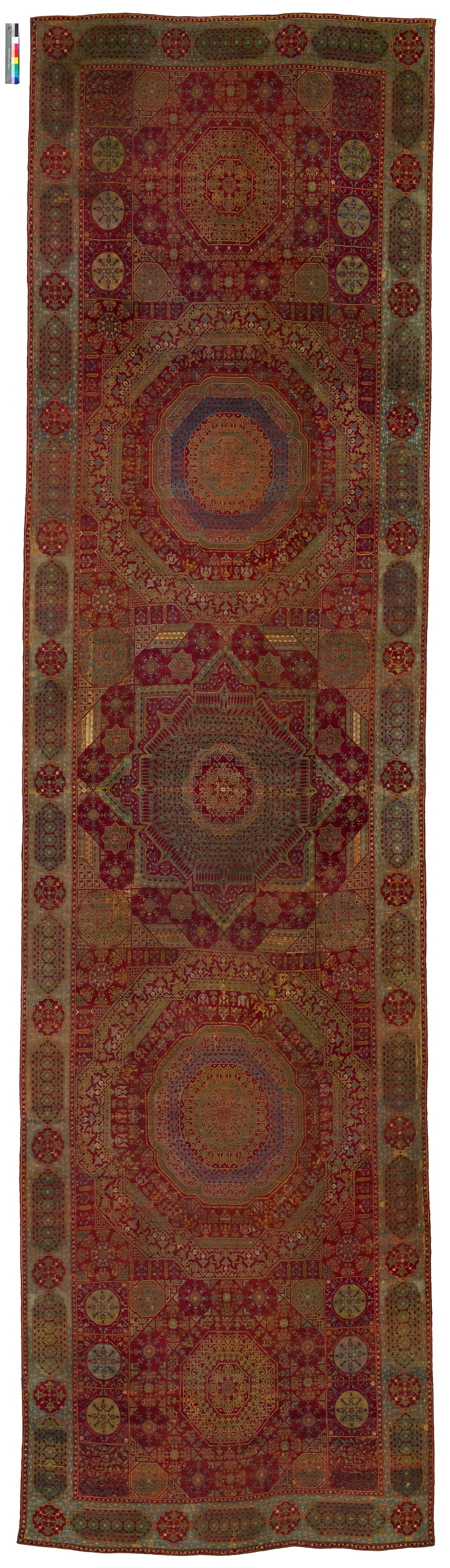
The 'Simonetti' Carpet, The Metropolitan Museum of Art, c. 1500

Two main weaving techniques are characteristic of Mamluk carpets produced in Cairene workshops: asymmetrical knots and S-spun wool. Mamluk Carpets have distinctive features in their design, often dominated by geometric motifs and were colored in mostly red with accents of blues, yellows, and greens. Kurt Erdmann categorized arrangements of Mamluk carpets and subdivided them into three main groups according to their main background: type 1) the quadrangular main background has a small squared pattern in each of the four corners, such as the Mamluk carpet at the Metropolitan Museum of Art datable to the late fifteenth/early sixteenth century; type 2) the rectangular main background consists of a central element flanked by oblong panels that are further divided into two, three, or five medallions with designs echoing the central element, similar to the arrangement of the Mamluk rug from the Philadelphia Museum of Art (c. 1500-1550); type 3) the large carpet with a main background is subdivided into multiple sections and medallions, like the famous 'Simonetti' Carpet from the Metropolitan Museum of Art(c. 1500).

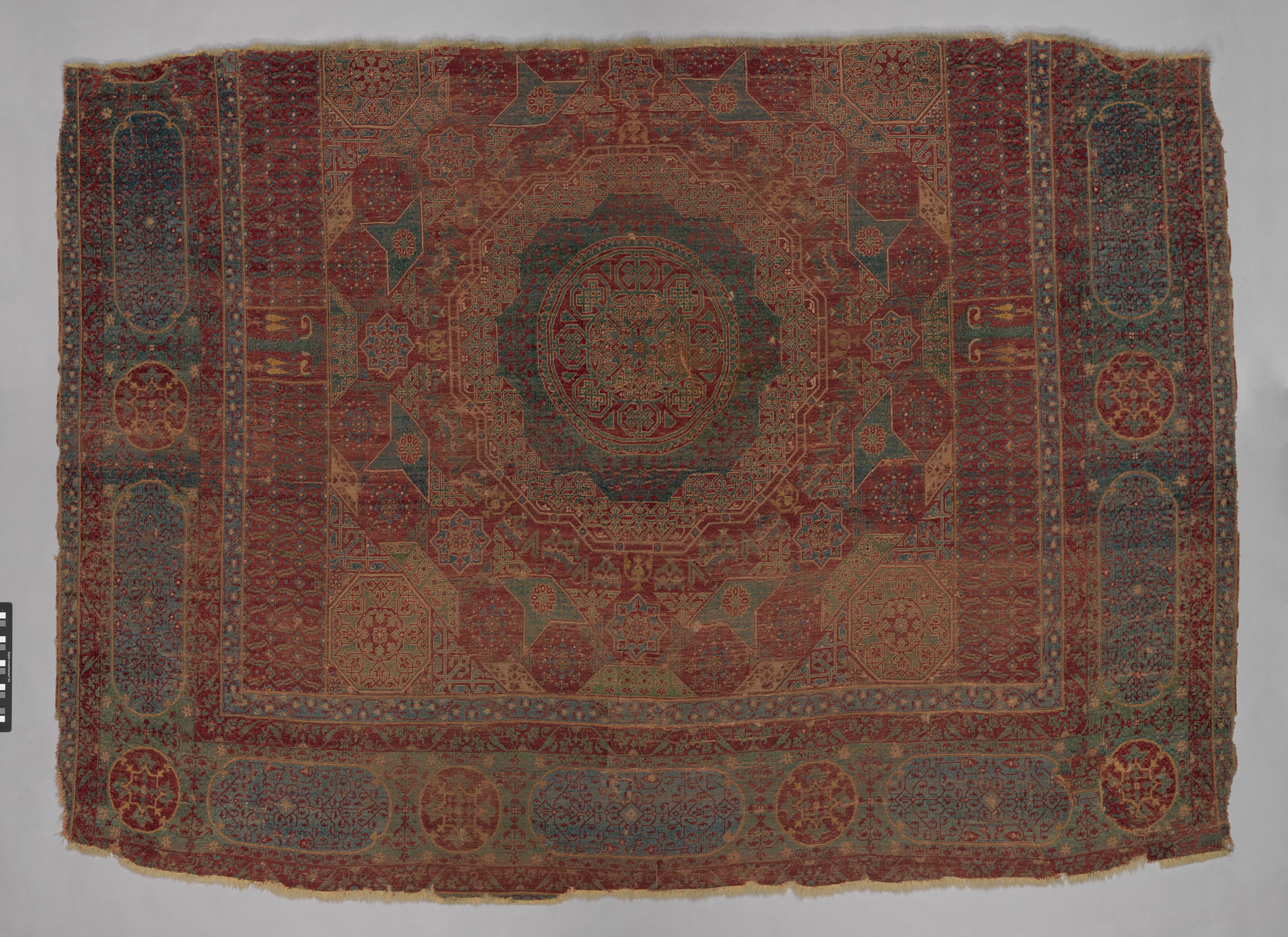
Fragment, The Metropolitan Museum of Art, Mamluk Carpet, early 16th century

The configuration of most Mamluk carpets can be simplified to a single central component radiating outwards from the core of the rug, which is either framed by the outer border or flanked by oblong panels often subdivided into tripartite shapes echoing the geometric design of the central component. In some cases the oblong panels contain rows of stylized cypresses, palm trees, and an umbrella-shaped leaf design, a common motif in Mamluk carpets; for example, the Kelekian Mamluk rug owned by the Textile Museum in Washington D.C. datable to the first half of the sixteenth century. The outer borders, a chief identifying feature of all Mamluk carpets, are consistently lined with medallions alternating with oval cartouches. Mamluk carpets have often been described as having a kaleidoscopic quality because of how the central design forms a series of interlacing stars and polygons around it, whereby each shape is further subdivided and decorated.

== Origins ==
Although a Cairene center of production has long been established as the origin of Mamluk carpet weaving, disputes regarding the stylistic origins of these carpets continue. Scholars argue that Mamluk carpets represent not only external influences, but also foreign technology introduced to Egypt by Iranian or Central Asian workers. The possibility of foreign craftsmen being in Cairo during the Mamluk period is based on the complex political situation between the Mamluks, Ottomans, and Turkman states of Iran and Anatolia which caused continual shifts in their political boundaries and, consequently, the mobility of their people. In 1467, the Karakoyunlu dynasty ended at the hands of the Akkoyunlu Turkmans; in the aftermath of this event, some artisans chose to remain in their chief city, Tabriz, and continued weaving as witnessed years later by the Venetian traveler who compared the carpets of Tabriz to those of Cairo, while other artisans must have sought employment elsewhere.

The artisans could have moved to the Ottoman and Mamluk capitals since the Mamluks had previously offered refuge to notables from Iran, such as Sultan Ahmad of the Jalayirid house and Kara Yusuf of the Karakoyunlu Dynasty. The court of Sultan Qaitbay, who played an influential role in Mamluk art patronage, would have supported the crafts of the newly arrived weavers. Since all the Mamluk carpets that survive are from the late fifteenth century onwards, there is no way to confirm whether Sultan Qaitbay had utilized the expertise of the foreign weavers to revive a once established tradition of carpet manufacturing or to introduce an entirely new one. After the 1517 Ottoman conquest of the Mamluk Sultanate in Egypt, the geometric compositions of Mamluk carpet designs were eventually abandoned and the curvilinear floral motifs were adopted in favor of the Ottoman court’s popular taste in ornamentation.

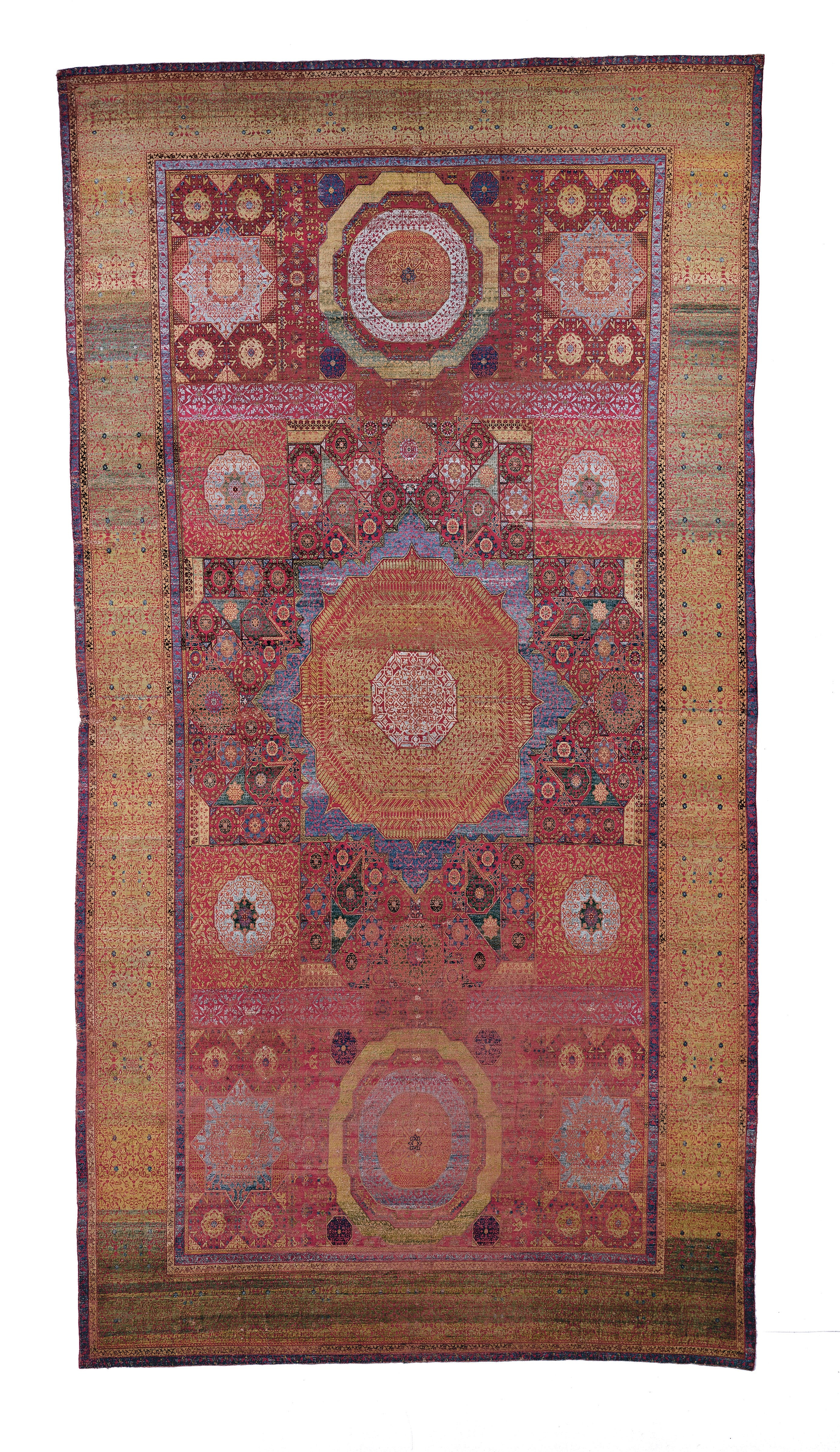
Silk Mamluk Carpet, MAK Vienna, Austria, c. 1500

== See also ==
- Oriental rug
