= Dawud Pasha of Baghdad =

Dawud Pasha დაუდ ფაშა
- Governor of Baghdad
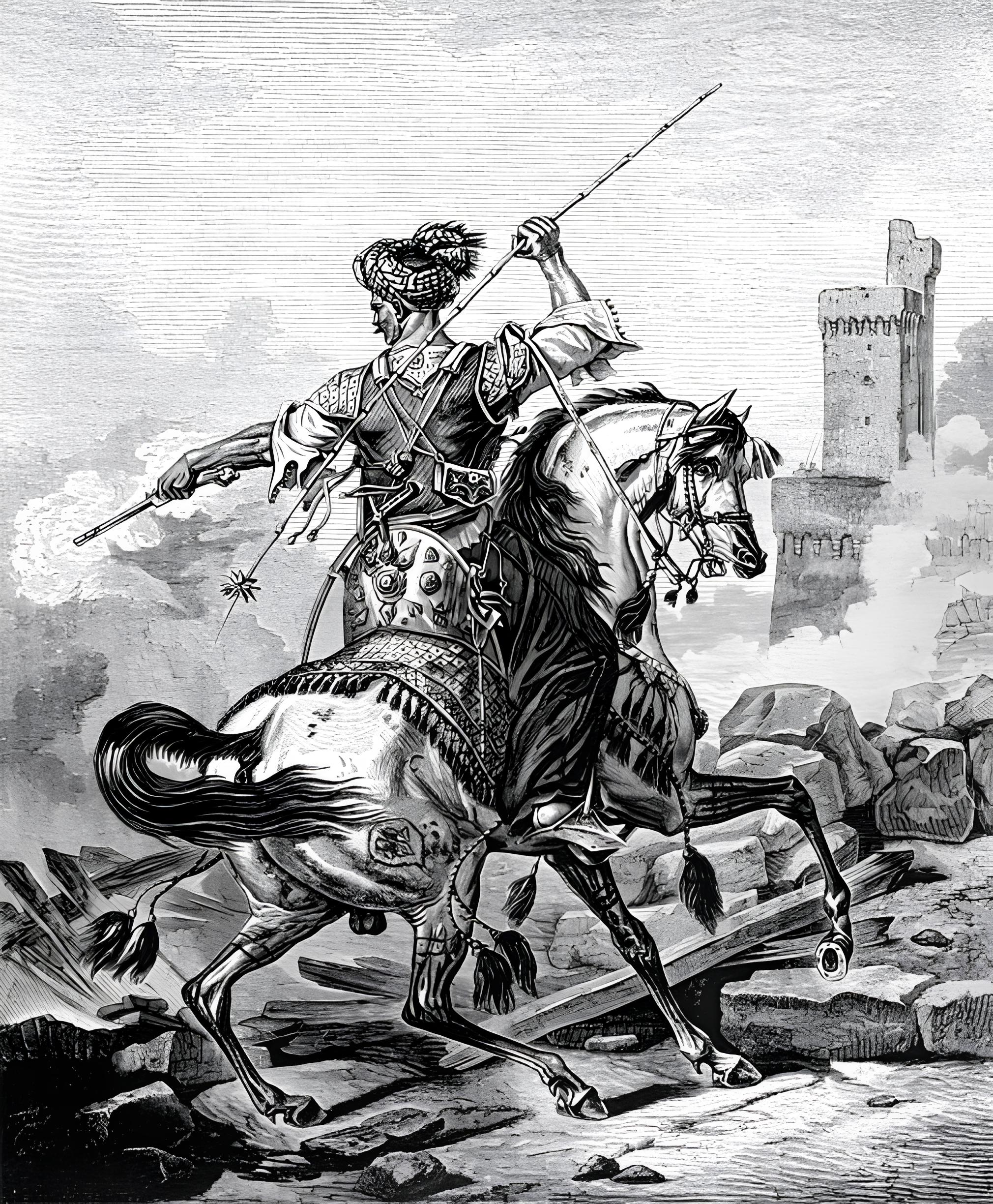
- A Mamluk cavalryman, drawing by Carle Vernet (1810). Identified as Dawud Pasha in Georgian sources.
- Reign: 1816 – 1831
- Predecessor: Said Pasha
- Successor: Ali Rıza Pasha
- Born: 1767
- Died: 1851 (aged 83–84)
- Burial: Tbilisi
- House: Mamluk dynasty
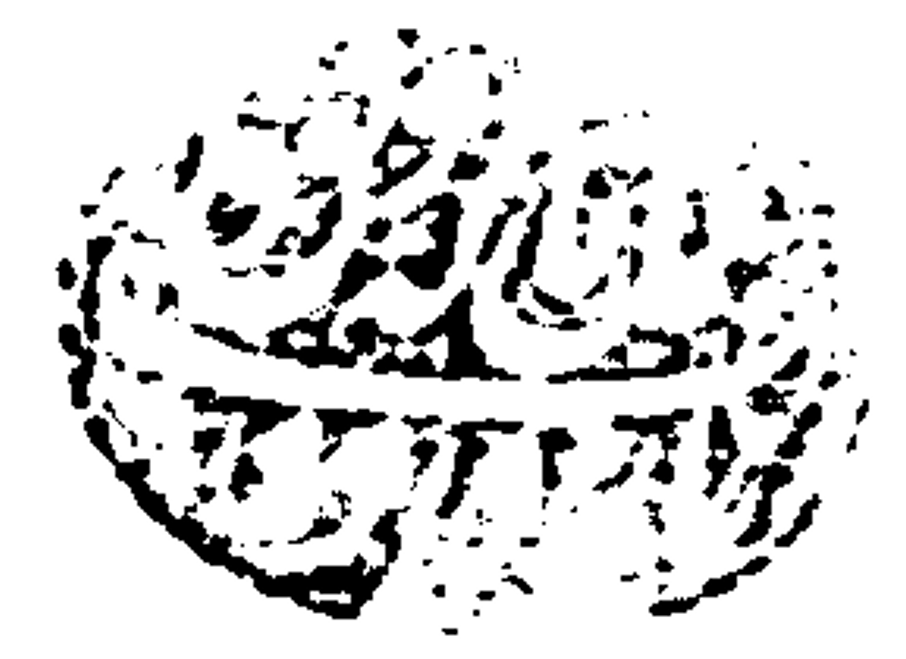
- Seal
- Military career
- Conflicts: See list: The ousting of Said Pasha; The suppression of the Arab Revolt (1813); Ottoman-Persian War (1820-1823); Siege of Baghdad (1821); Battle of Diyala River (1822); Kurdistan Campaign; Russo-Turkish War (1828–1829); Davud Pasha's Rebellion

Dawūd Pasha of Baghdad (Arabic: داود باشا Dāwūd Bashā; Georgian: დაუდ ფაშა; Turkish: Davut Paşa) (c. 1767–1851), born Davit Manvelashvili (Georgian: დავით მანველაშვილი in Tbilisi, Georgia, of Georgian origin) was the last Mamluk ruler of Iraq, from c. 1816 to 1831.

== Biography ==
Ottoman Iraq at this period was nominally part of the Ottoman Empire but in practice largely autonomous. Mamluks were originally freed slaves who had converted to Islam and were assigned to military and administrative duties in the Ottoman Empire. Mamluk rulers governed in the territory that became Iraq, acquiring increasing autonomy from the Ottoman Sultan in Constantinople, from 1704 to 1831.

The history of modern Iraq's boundaries can be traced to 1749, when the Ottoman Sultan extended the authority of the Mamluk Wali (Governor) of Basra to include the eyalet (province) of Baghdad, initiating a period of Mamluk rule that lasted until 1831. After seizing control of Baghdad Eyalet in 1816–1817, Dawud Pasha initiated modernization programs that included clearing canals, establishing industries, and reforming the army with the help of European instructors. The political and economic policies of Dawud Pasha united these eyalets, although their external borders were ill-defined.

Dawud Pasha leaving the Sarai Mosque, 1816.

Following Napoleon's invasion of Egypt, the British government had recognized the strategic importance of the Middle East in defending its eastern empire and commercial ambitions against the French (and later against Russia), and at the beginning of the nineteenth century had negotiated inter alia the establishment of a British consulate in Baghdad. Dawud Pasha reduced the influence of the British Consul, and, perhaps more controversially, compelled the British East India Company to begin paying duties on imported goods. It was at the instigation of the British government that the Ottoman Sultan seized back control of Baghdad, facilitating a resurgence of British influence in the region. In 1830, the Ottoman Sultan Mahmud II decreed Dawud Pasha's dismissal, which was enforced the following year by an army under Ali Ridha Pasha, who ousted Dawud and reimposed direct Ottoman rule on Iraq. Under his rule, the Baghdadi Jews were grievously persecuted resulting in the flight and emigration of many of the leading Baghdadi Jewish families such as the Sassoon and Judah families to India.

When his life ended, Dawud was a custodian of the shrine at Medina, the burial place of the Prophet Muhammad.

Dawud Pasha is said to have established the first newspaper of Iraq, Jurnal al-Iraq, in Baghdad in 1816, but this is disputed because there are no extant copies and no mention of it in the Ottoman archives or contemporary travellers' accounts.

== See also ==
- Mamluk dynasty of Iraq
- Siege of Baghdad (1821)
