= Mamluk dynasty of Iraq =

1704–1831 Georgian Mamluk dynasty under the Ottomans

Mamluk dynasty of Iraq مماليك العراق Mamālīk al-ʻIrāq
- 1704–1831
- Flag

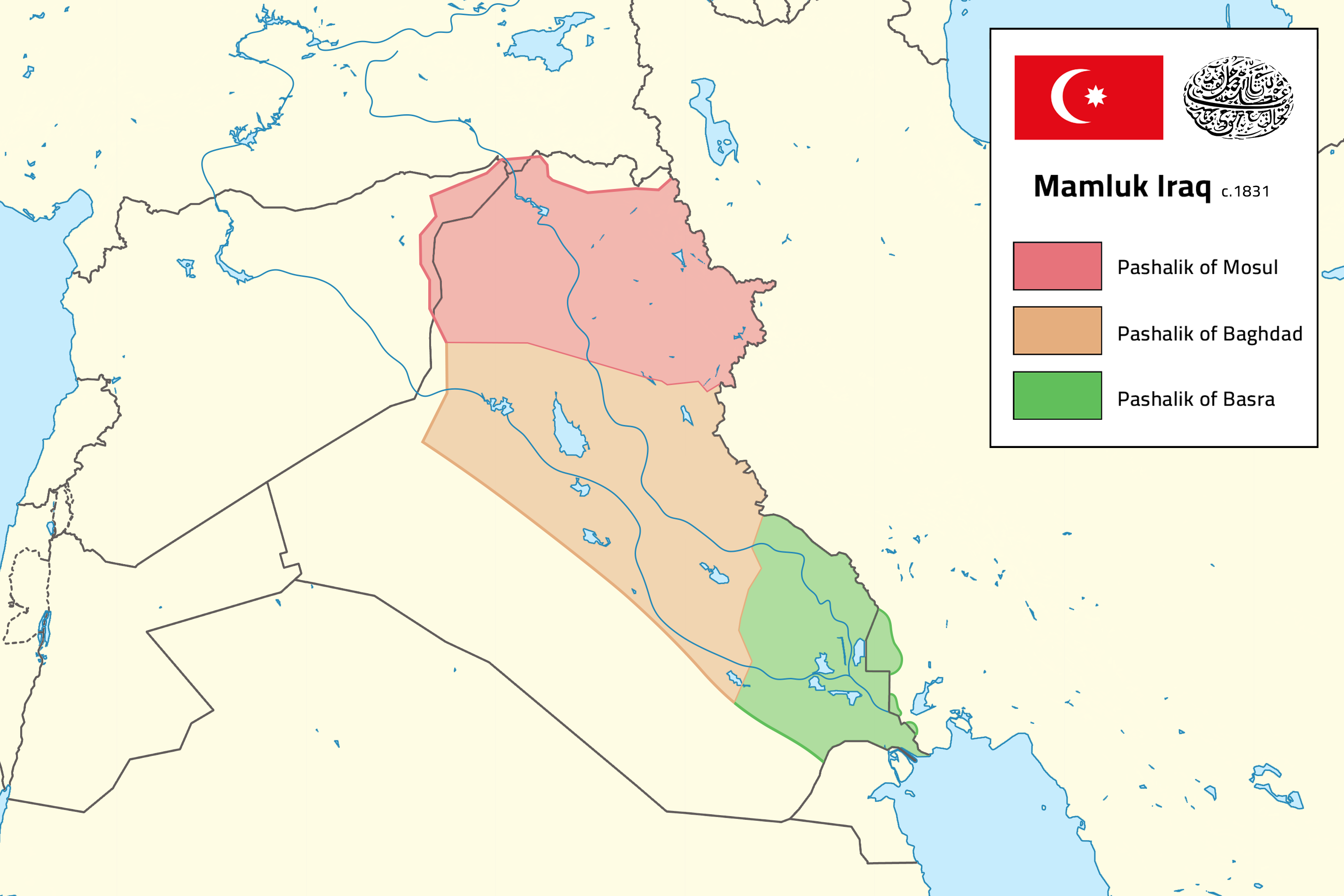
- Approximate extent of Mamluk rule, alongside the seal of Dawud Pasha.
- Status: Autonomous state under nominal Ottoman suzerainty
- Capital: Baghdad
- Common languages: Iraqi Arabic
- Religion: Sunni Islam (majority), also Shia Islam (In Najaf and Karbala), Christianity, Mandaeism, Judaism
- Government: Pashalik (autonomous)
- Pasha
  - (1704–1723): Hassan Pasha
  - (1816–1831): Dawud Pasha
- History
  - Dynasty formed: 1704
  - Ottoman reconquest: 1831
Preceded by	Succeeded by
Ottoman Iraq	Ottoman Iraq
- Today part of: Iraq

The Mamluk dynasty of Iraq (Arabic: مماليك العراق, romanized: Mamālīk al-ʻIrāq) was a dynasty of Georgian Mamluk origin which ruled over Iraq in the 18th and early 19th centuries.

In the Ottoman Empire, Mamluks were freedmen who converted to Islam, were trained in a special school, and then assigned to military and administrative duties. Such Mamluks presided over Iraq from 1704 to 1831.

The Mamluk ruling elite, composed principally of Georgian and Circassian origin from Caucasian officers, succeeded in asserting autonomy from their Ottoman overlords, and restored order and some degree of economic prosperity in the region. The Ottomans overthrew the Mamluk regime in 1831 and gradually imposed their direct rule over Iraq, which would last until World War I, although the Mamluks continued to be a dominant socio-political force in Iraq, as most of the administrative personnel of note in Baghdad were drawn from former Mamluk households, or comprised a cross-section of the notable class in Mamluk times.

== Background ==
Even before the rise of the Mamluks, Iraq was never fully integrated into the Ottoman administrative system. The Mosul province was placed under the timar system where taxes were farmed out to cavalry officers. Baghdad and Basra were placed under the salyane system where taxation was farmed out to the governors. Constant war with Iran weakened Ottoman control further. By the 1700s this problem was becoming worse.

The early 18th century was a time of important changes both in Constantinople and in Baghdad. The reign of Sultan Ahmed III (1703–30) was marked by relative political stability in the capital and by extensive reforms—some of them influenced by European models—implemented during the Tulip Period by Grand Vizier İbrahim Pasha.

As in the previous two centuries, Iraq continued to be a battleground between the rival Ottoman Empire and Safavid Empire. The region also suffered from frequent inter-clan struggles.

== History ==
=== Dynasty of Hasan Pasha ===
The Mamluks ruled the pashaliks of Baghdad, Basrah, and Shahrizor. The pashalik of Mosul was ruled by the Iraqi Jalili dynasty.

- Hassan Pasha (1704–1723)
- Ahmad Pasha (1723–1747) son of Hassan
- Sulayman Abu Layla (1749–1762) son-in-law of Ahmad
- Omar Pasha (1762–1776) son of Ahmad
- Abdullah Pasha (1776–1777)
- Sulayman the Great (1780–1802) son of Omar
- Ali Al-Kahiya (1802–1807) son of Omar
- Sulayman the Little (1807–1810) son of Sulayman Great
- Said Pasha (1813–1816) son of Sulayman Great
- Dawud Pasha (1816–1831)

==== Hassan Pasha (1704–1723) ====
In Baghdad, Hassan Pasha (Georgian: ჰასან ფაშა), the Ottoman governor of Georgian origin sent from Constantinople, and his son Ahmad Pasha (1723–47) established a Georgian Mamluk household, through which they exercised authority and administered the province.

==== Ahmad Pasha (1723–1747) ====
Hassan's son and successor, Ahmad (Georgian: აჰმედ ფაშა), continued to recruit the Mamluks and promoted them to key administrative and military positions. Both Hasan and Ahmad rendered a valuable service to the Ottoman Porte by curbing the unruly tribes and securing a steady inflow of taxes to the treasury in Constantinople as well as by defending Iraq against yet another military threat from the Safavids and Afsharids of Iran.

By the time Ahmad Pasha died in 1747, his Mamluks had been organized into a powerful, self-perpetuating elite corps of some 2,000 men ("Georgian Guard"). On Ahmad's death, the sultan attempted to prevent these Mamluks from assuming power and sent an outsider as his wali in Baghdad. However, Ahmad's son-in-law Sulayman Abu Layla, already in charge of Basra, marched on Baghdad in the head of his Georgian guard and ousted the Ottoman administrator, thereby inaugurating 84 years of the Mamluk rule in Iraq.

==== Sulayman Abu Layla (1749–1762) ====
By 1750, Sulayman Abu Layla had established himself as an undisputed master at Baghdad and had been recognized by the Porte as the first Mamluk Pasha of Iraq. The newly established regime embarked on a campaign to gain more autonomy from the Ottoman government and to curb the resistance of the Arab and Kurdish tribes. They managed to counter Al-Muntafiq threats in the south and brought Basra under their control. They encouraged Omani and European trade and allowed the British East India Company to establish an agency in Basra in 1763.

==== Omar Pasha (1762–1776) ====
The successes of Mamluk regime, however, still depended on their ability to cooperate with their Ottoman suzerains and religious elite within Iraq. The Porte sometimes employed force to depose the recalcitrant pashas of Baghdad, but the Mamluks were able to retain their hold of the pashalik, and even enlarged their domains. They failed, however, to secure a regular system of succession and the gradual formation of rival Mamluk households resulted in factionalism and frequent power struggles. Another major menace to the Mamluk rule came from Iran whose resurgent ruler, Karim Khan, invaded Iraq and installed his brother Sadiq Khan in Basra in 1776 after a protracted and stubborn resistance offered by the Mamluk general Sulayman Aga. The Porte hastened to exploit the crisis and replaced Omar Pasha (Georgian: ომარ ფაშა) with a non-Mamluk, who proved incapable of keeping order.

==== Sulayman the Great (1780–1802) ====
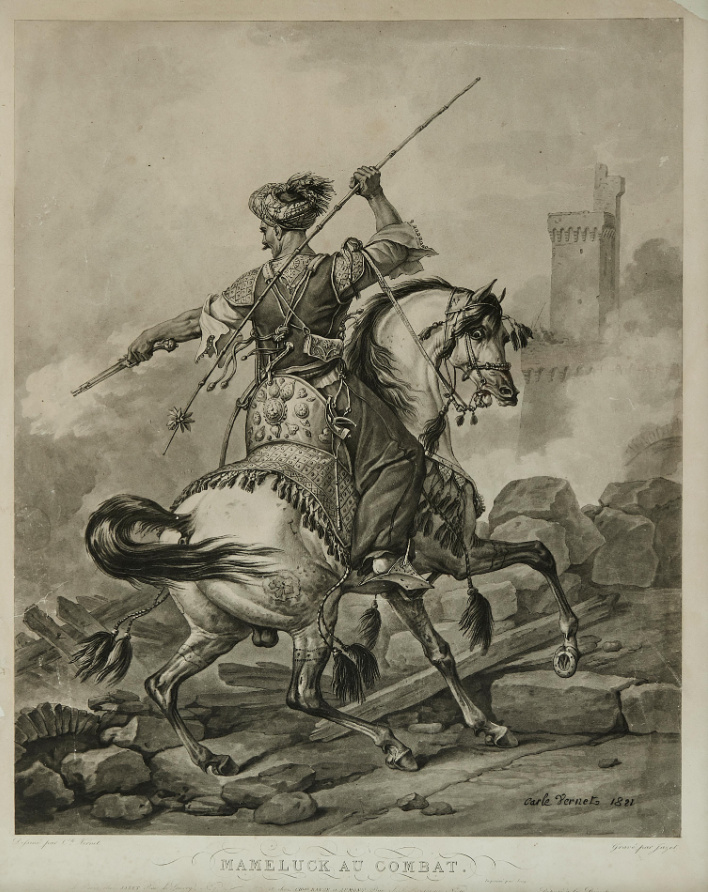
A Mamluk cavalryman, as drawn by Carle Vernet in 1810.

In 1779, Sulayman the Great (Georgian: სულეიმან ბუიუქი) returned from his exile in Shiraz and acquired the governorship of Baghdad, Basrah, and Shahrizor in 1780. This Sulayman the Great is known as Büyük ('the Great' in Turkish; Ottoman Turkish: بیوك), and his rule (1780–1802) was efficient at first, but weakened as he grew older. He imported large numbers of Georgians to strengthen his clan, asserted his supremacy over the factionalized Mamluk households and restricted the influence of Janissaries. He fostered economy and continued to encourage commerce and diplomacy with Europe, which received a major boost in 1798 when Sulayman gave permission for a permanent British agent to be appointed in Baghdad. However, his struggle against the Arab tribes in Northern Iraq was less despite the fact that he brutally crushed the revolters.

==== Ali Al-kahiya (1802–1807) ====
The aftermath of Sulayman the Great's death in 1802 was a power struggle between Ali Pasha the Kaymakam, Ahmad Agha leader of the Janissaries, and Selim agha, which was won by Ali Al-kahiya (Georgian: ალი ფაშა), who started a campaign to discipline Kurdish tribes who paid a tribute through their animals, then put down a rebellion by the Yazidis in Sinjar, then rode to Tal Afar and arrested Muhammad beg al Shawi and his brother and executed them both, due to animosity towards them, then he returned to Baghdad to quell disorder there.

Ali Al-kahiya repelled the Wahhabi raids against Najaf and Hillah in 1803 and 1806 but failed to challenge their domination of the desert.

Ali Al-kahiya was assassinated in 1807 by Madar beg al Abadhi and his followers due to personal grudges against him, while Ali was praying, by stabbing, They initially escaped but were apprehended and killed with their bodies sent to Baghdad.

==== Sulayman the Little (1807–1810) ====
After Ali's assassination in 1807, his nephew Sulayman the Little took over the government. Inclined to curtail provincial autonomies, Sultan Mahmud II (1808–39) made his first attempt to oust the Mamluks from Baghdad in 1810. Ottoman troops deposed and killed Sulayman, but again failed to maintain control of the country. After yet another bitter internecine feud in 1816, Sulayman's energetic son-in-law Dawud Pasha ousted his rival Said Pasha (Georgian: საიდ ფაშა; 1813–16) and took control of Baghdad. The Ottoman government reluctantly recognized his authority.

==== Dawud Pasha (1816–1831) ====
Dawud Pasha (Georgian: დაუდ ფაშა) was the last of the Mamluk rulers of Iraq. Dawud Pasha initiated important modernization programs that included clearing canals, establishing industries, reforming the army with the help of European instructors, and founding a printing press. He maintained elaborate pomp and circumstance at his court. Besides the usual troubles with the Arab tribes and internal dissensions with sheikhs, he was involved in more serious fighting with the Kurds and the conflict with Iran over the influence in the Kurdish principality of Baban. The conflict culminated in the Iranian invasion of Iraq and the occupation of Sulaymaniyah in 1818. Later, Dawud Pasha capitalized on the destruction of Janissaries at Constantinople in 1826, and eliminated the Janissaries as an independent local force.

Meanwhile, the existence of the autonomous regime in Iraq, a long-time source of anxiety at Constantinople, became even more threatening to the Porte when Muhammad Ali Pasha of Egypt began to claim Ottoman Syria. In 1830, the Sultan decreed Dawud Pasha's dismissal, but the emissary carrying the order was arrested at Baghdad and executed. In 1831, the Ottoman army under Ali Riza Pasha marched from Aleppo into Iraq. Devastated by floods and an epidemic of bubonic plague, Baghdad capitulated after a ten-week-long blockade which caused mass-famine. Dawud Pasha, facing opposition from local clergymen within Iraq, surrendered to the Ottomans and was treated with favor. His life ended in 1851, while he was custodian of the shrine at Medina. The arrival of the Sultan's new governor in Baghdad in 1831 signaled the beginning of a direct Ottoman rule in Iraq.

The new Ottoman governor, Ali Ridha Pasha, was forced to come to terms with the still-pervasive Mamluk presence in Baghdad even after the last Mamluk ruler had been deposed. He later married the daughter of former Mamluk governor Sulayman the Little (1807–1810).

== See also ==
- List of Ottoman governors of Baghdad
- Jalili dynasty, rulers of the pashalik of Mosul in this period.
- Naji Shawkat, Prime Minister of Iraq from 1932 to 1933, who was the scion of one of the Georgian Mamluk clans.
- History of Baghdad 1831-1917
