= Fatimid architecture =

Building style of the 10th to 12th centuries

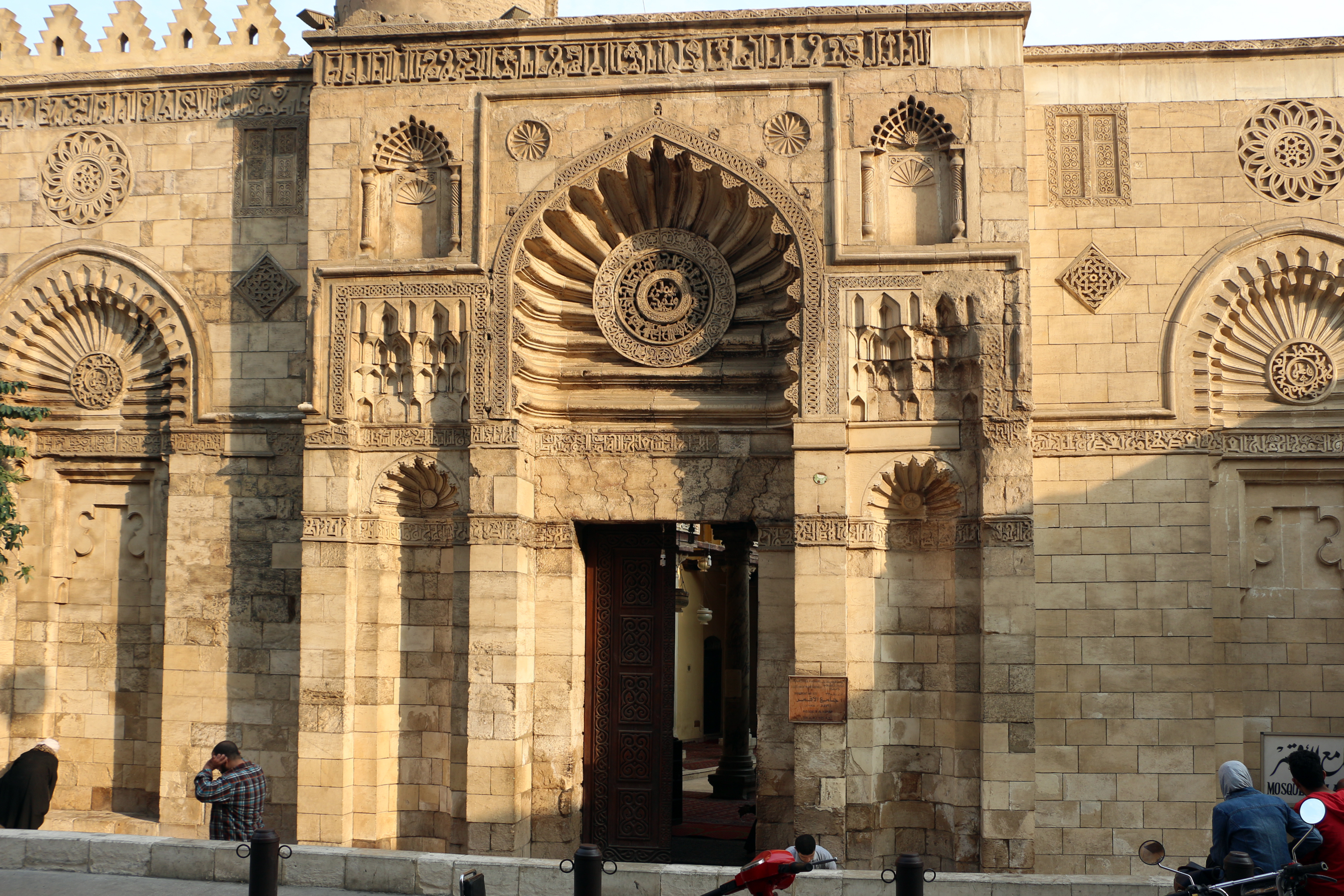
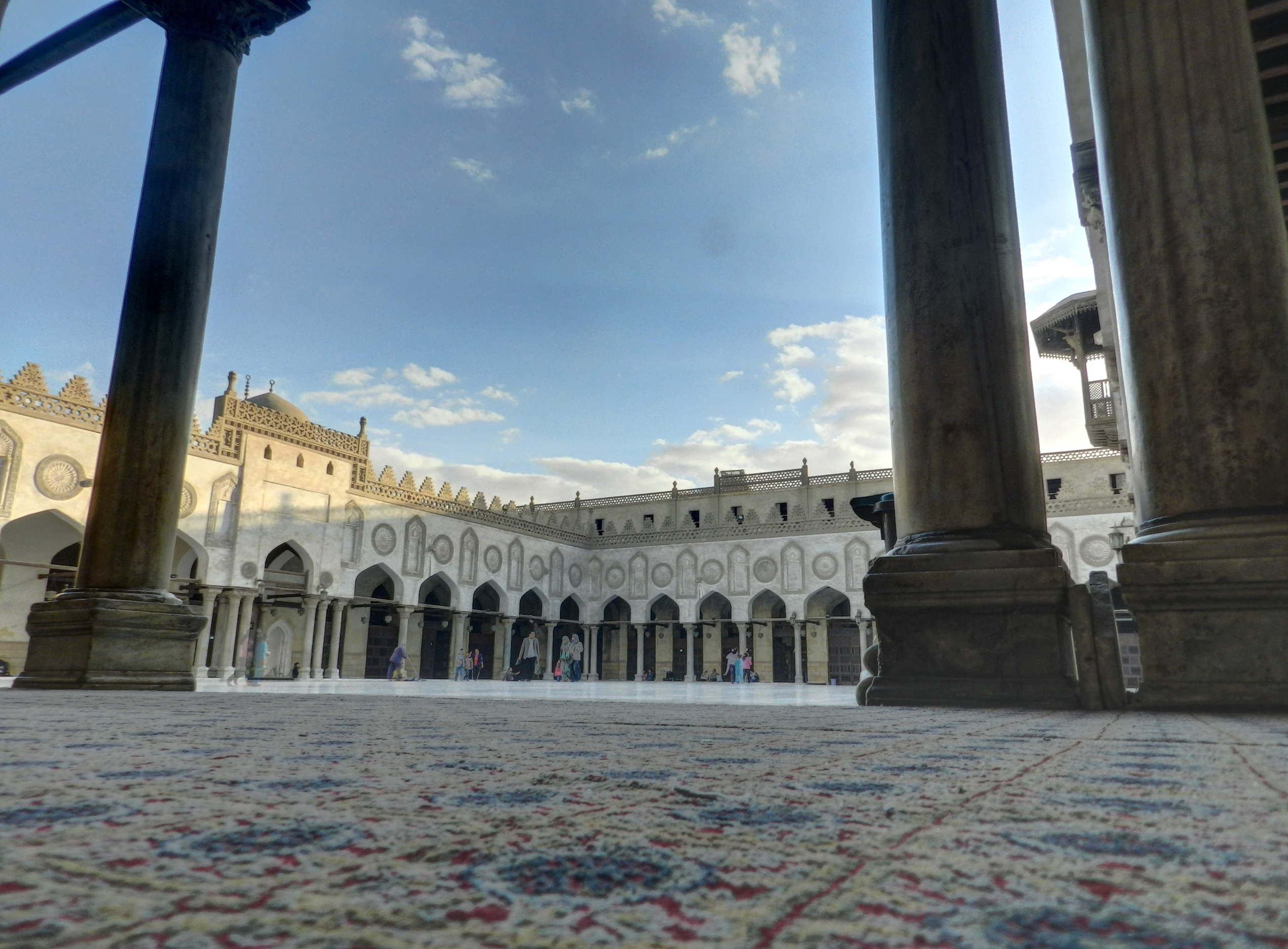
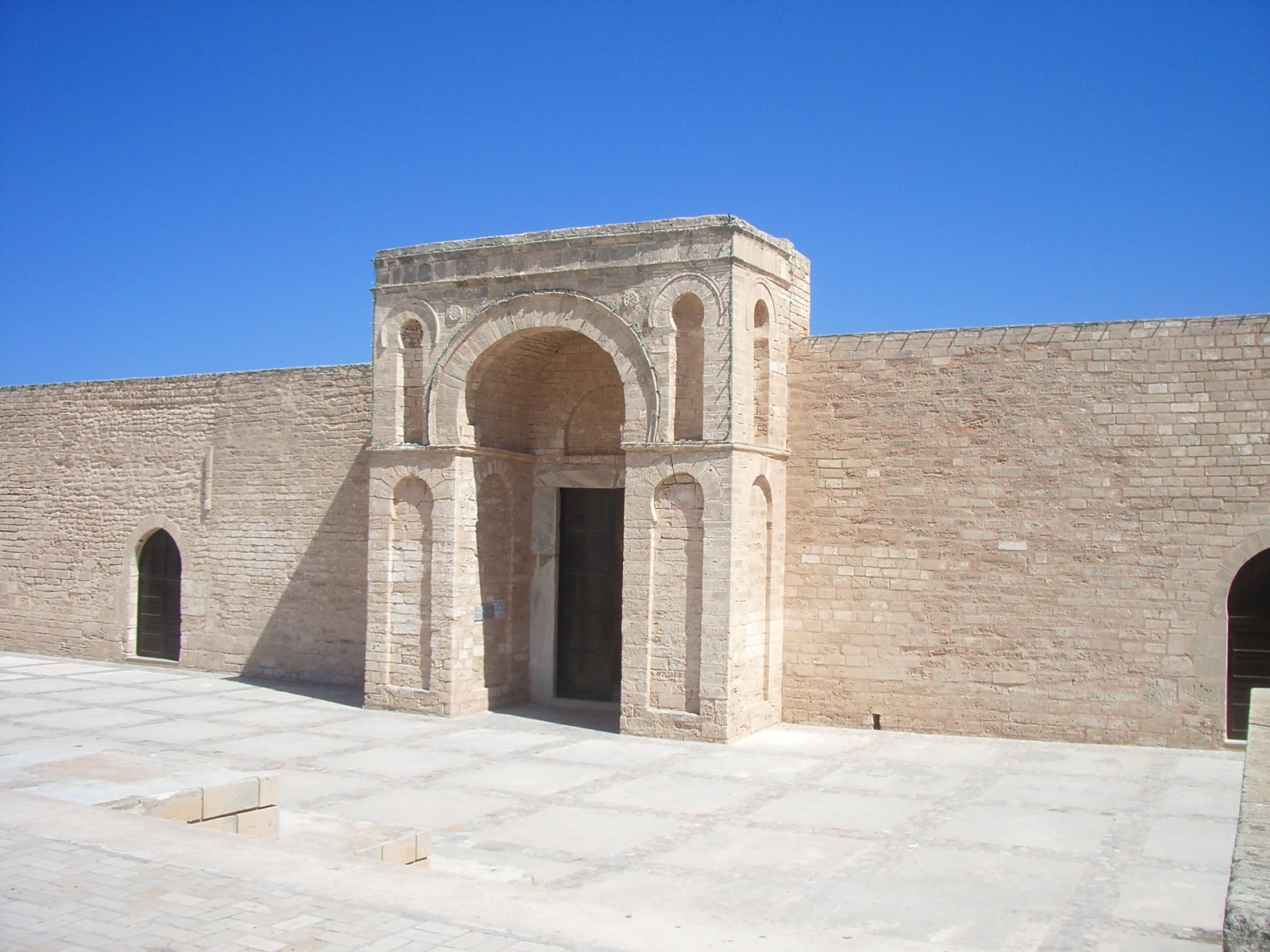
- Top: Al-Aqmar Mosque, Cairo (1125-6); Middle: Al-Azhar Mosque, Cairo (972); Bottom: Great Mosque of Mahdiya, Tunisia (916)
- Years active: 909–1171 CE

Fatimid architecture, developed in the Fatimid Caliphate (909–1171 CE) of North Africa, combined elements of eastern and western architecture, drawing on Abbasid, Byzantine, Coptic architecture and North African traditions; it bridged early Islamic styles and the medieval architecture of the Mamluks of Egypt, introducing many innovations.

The wealth of Fatimid architecture was found in the main cities of Mahdia (921–948), Al-Mansuriya (948–973) and Cairo (973–1171). The heartland of architectural activity and expression during Fatimid rule was at al-Qahira (Cairo), on the eastern side of the Nile, where many of the palaces, mosques and other buildings were built. Large-scale constructions were undertaken during the reigns of al-Mui'zz (r. 953–975) Al-Aziz Billah (r. 975–996) and al-Hakim (r. 996–1021).

The Fatimid caliphs competed with the rulers of the Abbasid and Byzantine empires and indulged in luxurious palace building. Their palaces, their greatest architectural achievements, are known only by written descriptions, however. Several surviving tombs, mosques, gates and walls, mainly in Cairo, retain original elements, although they have been extensively modified or rebuilt in later periods. Notable extant examples of Fatimid architecture include the Great Mosque of Mahdiya, and the Al-Azhar Mosque, Al-Hakim Mosque, Al-Aqmar Mosque, Juyushi Mosque and Lulua Mosque of Cairo.

Although heavily influenced by architecture from Mesopotamia and Byzantium, the Fatimids introduced or developed unique features such as the four-centred keel arch and the squinch, connecting square interior volumes to the dome. Their mosques followed the hypostyle plan, where a central courtyard was surrounded by arcades with their roofs usually supported by keel arches, initially resting on columns with leafy Corinthian order capitals. They typically had features such as portals that protrude from the wall, domes above mihrabs and qiblas, and façade ornamentation with iconographic inscriptions, and stucco decorations. The woodwork of the doors and interiors of the buildings was often finely carved. The Fatimids also made considerable development towards mausoleum building. The mashhad, a shrine that commemorates a descendant of the Islamic prophet Muhammad, was a characteristic type of Fatimid architecture. Three Fatimid-era gates in Cairo, Bab al-Nasr (1087), Bab al-Futuh (1087) and Bab Zuweila (1092), built under the orders of the vizier Badr al-Jamali (r. 1074–1094), have survived. Though they have been altered over the centuries, they have Byzantine architectural features, with little trace of the eastern Islamic tradition.

Many of the features and techniques of Fatimid architecture continued to be used in the architecture of their successors, the Ayyubids, and more generally in the architecture of Cairo afterwards. Recently, a "Neo-Fatimid" style has emerged, used in restorations or in modern Shia mosques by the Dawoodi Bohra, which claims continuity from the original Fatimid architecture.

== Background ==
=== Origins ===
The Fatimid Caliphate originated in an Ismaili Shia movement launched in Salamiyah, on the western edge of the Syrian Desert, by Abd Allah al-Akbar, a claimed eighth generation descendant of the Islamic prophet Muhammad, through Muhammad's daughter Fatimah. In 899 his grandson, to be known as Abd Allah al-Mahdi, became leader of the movement. He fled from his enemies to Sijilmasa in Morocco, under the guise of being a merchant. He was supported by a militant named Abu Abd Allah al-Shi'i, who organized a Berber uprising that overthrew the Tunisian Aghlabid dynasty, and then invited al-Mahdi to assume the position of imam and caliph. The empire grew to include Sicily and to stretch across North Africa from the Atlantic to Libya. The Fatimid caliphs built three capital cities, which they occupied in sequential order: Mahdia (921–948) and al-Mansuriya (948–973) in Ifriqiya and Cairo (973–1171) in Egypt.

=== Ifriqiya ===
Mahdia was a walled city located on a peninsula that projected into the Mediterranean from the coast of what is now Tunisia, then part of Ifriqiya. (Note: Ifriqiya was the western part of the Fatimid caliphate, covering the northern part of what today is western Libya, Tunisia and eastern Algeria.) The Carthaginian port of Zella had once occupied the site. Mahdia was founded in 913 by Abdallah al-Mahdi Billah, the first Fatimid imam-caliph. Al-Mahdi built the Great Mosque of Mahdiya, the earliest Fatimid mosque, in the new city. The other buildings erected nearby at that time have since disappeared, but the monumental access gate and portico in the north of the mosque are preserved from the original structure.

Al-Mansuriya, near Kairouan, Tunisia, was the capital of Fatimid Caliphate during the rules of the Imams al-Mansur bi-Nasr Allah (r. 946–953) and al-Mu'izz li-Din Allah (r. 953–975). Built between 946 and 972, it was a circular walled city holding elaborate palaces surrounded by gardens, artificial pools and water channels.

After the Fatimid conquest of Egypt in 969, the caliph al-Mu'izz moved from the city to the new city of al-Qāhira (Cairo) in 973, but al-Mansuriya continued to serve as the provincial capital. In 1057 it was abandoned and destroyed. Any useful objects or materials were scavenged during the centuries that followed. Today only faint traces remain.

=== Egypt ===
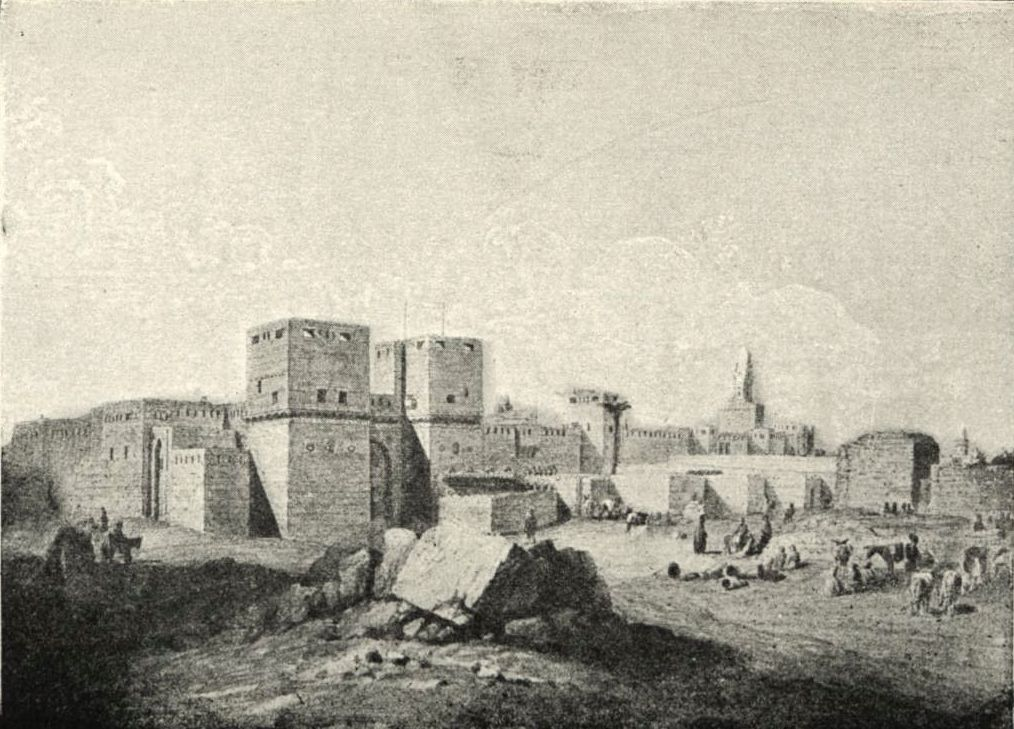
1830 view of the gate of Bab al-Nasr, Cairo, built by Badr al-Jamali in 1087

The Fatimid general, Jawhar al-Siqilli, built a new palace city near to the old capital of Fustat upon conquering Egypt in 969, which he at first called al-Mansuriya after the capital in Tunisia. When al-Mu'izz arrived in 973, the name was changed to al-Qāhira (Cairo). The new city incorporated elements of the design of al-Mansuriya, although it was rectangular rather than circular in plan. Both cities had mosques named al-Azhar after Muhammad's daughter, Fatima al-Azhar, and both had gates named Bab al-Futuh and Bab Zuwaila. Both cities had two palaces, for the caliph and for his heir, opposite and facing each other.

Some of the most impressive, large-scale Fatimid mosques and palaces were built in Cairo during the reigns of al-Mu'izz and his successors, al-Aziz and al-Hakim. The reign of Al-Aziz (r. 975–996) is generally considered to have been the most prosperous. Aided in part by funds generated through his father al-Mu'izz's tax reforms, Al-Aziz is credited with at least 13 major building works during this reign, including palaces, a mosque, a fortress, a belvedere, a bridge and public baths. He was responsible for building and expanding much of the great palace complex in Cairo that had been first established under his father. Among other works, he built the Western Palace and ordered the construction of further additions to the Eastern Palace complex, including the "Great Hall" (al-Iwan al-Kabir) and the "Golden Palace" (Qasr al-Dhahab). He also began construction of a large mosque which was completed after his death by his successor, al-Hakim. Under al-Aziz's rule the ceremonial aspects and rituals involving the Fatimid imam-caliph became more elaborate. In contrast to Abbasid practices in Baghdad, in which the caliph's activities were generally confined to the palace, Fatimid ceremonial practices became increasingly integrated with the surrounding urban environment of Cairo. The imam-caliph often went on processions through the city and visited mosques and shrines, including newly-built monuments sponsored by the ruler or his family.

Al-Aziz's mother, Durzan, widow of al-Mu'izz, was also responsible for ordering the commencement of building projects, mainly in the Qarafa area, ordering construction of the second mosque in Cairo, Jami al-Qarafa Mosque, in 975. Similar to the first mosque, Al-Azhar Mosque, it had some fourteen gates but was later destroyed by fire, leaving only its "green mihrab". Durzan is also credited with ordering construction of the Qarafa Palace, a public bath, cistern, or pool, and a royal garden and hydraulic pump for the Abu'l-Ma'lum fortress. She also ordered a well to be built in the courtyard of Ibn Tulun Mosque in 995, a pavilion overlooking the Nile called Manazil al-'izz, and her own mausoleum in Qarafa.

Fatimid fortunes declined in the mid-11th century, but order was temporarily restored by a line of powerful viziers in the late 11th century. The Armenian vizier Badr al-Jamali was a noted builder, sponsoring numerous state architectural projects and restoration works during his rule from 1074 to 1094, particularly with mosques, restoring minarets in Upper Egypt and building mosques in Lower Egypt. He also rebuilt the walls and gates of Cairo. While large-scale mosques and major public works were rare during this later period, smaller mosques and new commemorative shrines (mashhads) attest to the maintenance of a high standard of craftsmanship in art and architecture.

== Architectural style ==
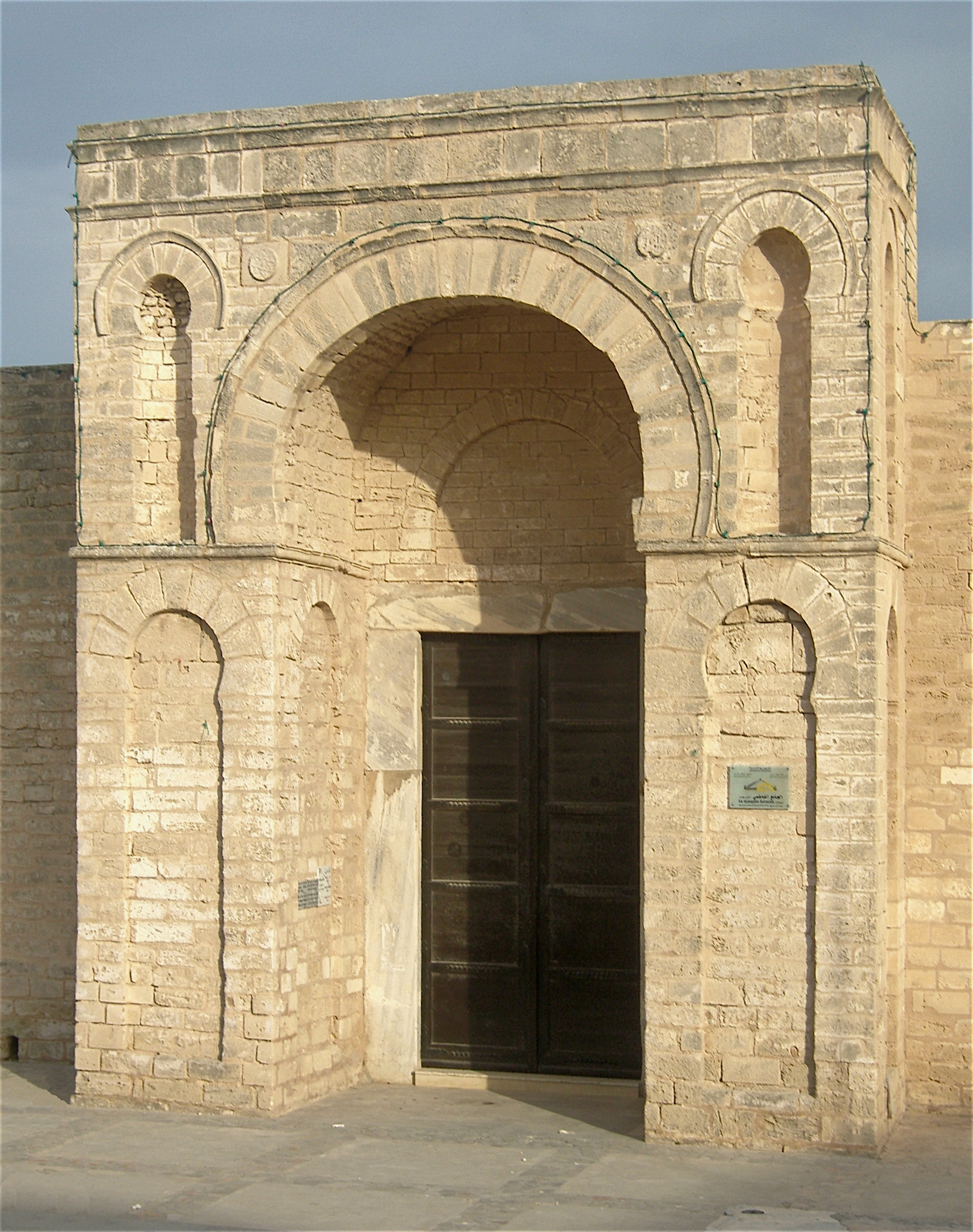
Entrance gate of the Great Mosque of Mahdiya. In this early structure the arch is round rather than keel-shaped

Fatimid architecture drew together decorative and architectural elements from the east and west, and spanned from the early Islamic period to the Middle Ages, making it difficult to categorize. Art historian Jonathan Bloom states that Fatimid art and architecture must be understood in the context not only of Ifriqiya and Egypt (the central territories they occupied), but in the context of the wider Mediterranean world, including the contemporary cultures of the Umayyad Caliphate of Córdoba and the Byzantine Empire. The architecture that developed as an indigenous form under the Fatimids incorporated elements from Samarra, the seat of the Abbasids, as well as Coptic and Byzantine features. Fatimid architecture bridged early Islamic styles and later medieval Islamic architecture, such as that of the Mamluks. The Fatimids were also unusually tolerant of people with different ethnic origins and religious views, and were adept at exploiting their abilities. Thus many of the works of Fatimid architecture reflect architectural details imported from Northern Syria and Mesopotamia, probably in part due to the fact that they often employed architects from these places to construct their buildings. Fatimid architecture in Egypt drew from earlier Tulunid styles and techniques, and used similar types of material. While also consciously adhering to Abbasid architectural concepts, the architecture is more influenced by Mediterranean cultures and less by Iranian.

According to Ira M. Lapidus, public architecture under the Fatimids was an "extension of the ceremonial aspects of the royal court", and was also intricately made. Most early buildings of the Fatimid period were of brick, although from the 12th century onward stone gradually became the chief building material. While Fatimid architecture followed traditional plans and aesthetics, it differed in architectural details such as the massive portals of some mosques and their elaborate façades. Scholars such as Doğan Kuban describe Fatimid architecture as "inventive more in decoration than in broad architectural concept", although he acknowledges that the Fatimids contributed to a distinct style of mosque. The Fatimids introduced or developed the usage of the four-centred keel arch (Note: The term "keel arch" comes from their shape resembling that of the keel of an upturned boat.) and the muqarnas squinch, a feature connecting the square to the dome. The muqarnas squinch was a complex innovation. In it a niche was placed between two niche segments, over which there was another niche. It is possible that this design had Iranian inspiration. A similar system was applied to window building.

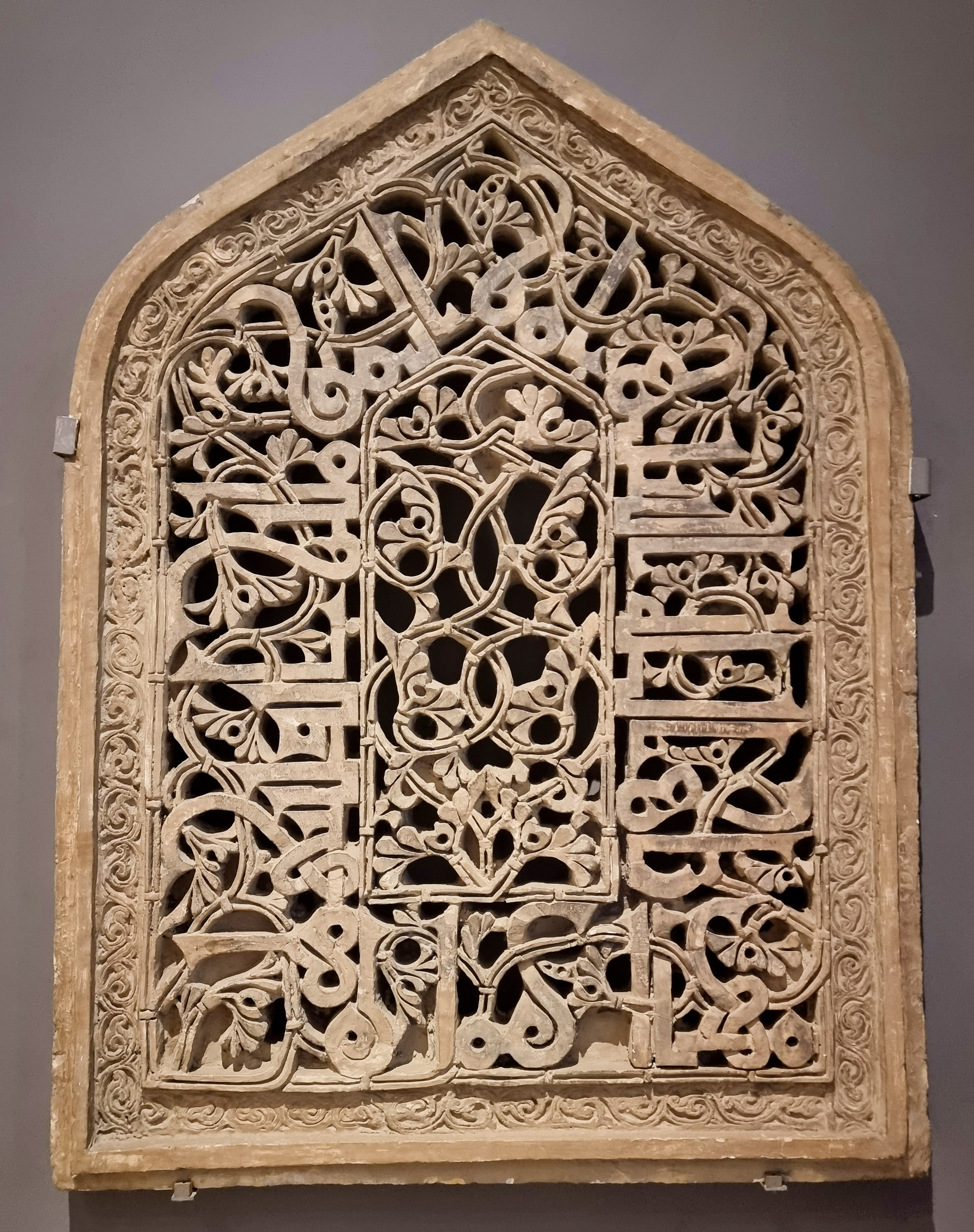
A stucco window grille from the Mosque of Salih Tala'i (1160) in Cairo, exemplifying the use of ornate vegetal and Kufic script decoration

Fatimid architecture in Cairo also displays certain trends in surface decoration. While Samarran (Abbasid) and Byzantine motifs were major sources of inspiration, Fatimid ornamentation evolved to be less repetitive, more complex, and more specially tailored to suit the surface being decorated. Floral, arabesque, and geometric motifs were the main features. Arabic inscriptions were also carved in a Kufic script which became increasingly ornate, often "floriated" or embellished with floral and vegetal motifs. Carved stucco was already in use during the preceding period of Abbasid domination, as seen in the 9th-century Ibn Tulun Mosque, and it continued to be used in Fatimid Cairo, alongside carving in wood and stone. (Note: Fragments of stucco decoration have also been found during modern excavations at al-Mansuriyya, the Fatimid capital in Ifriqiya, but they may post-date the Fatimid occupation of the city.) The remains of Fatimid stucco decoration inside al-Azhar Mosque, for example, show the lingering influence of Abbasid motifs but also display Byzantine and Coptic elements. Arches were often outlined with bands of stucco carved with Kufic inscriptions, a trend which was unique to the Fatimid period. Keel arches, used as structural elements, were also employed as a motif in the shape of decorative niches on walls and façades. These niches were ribbed or fluted with a central radiating motif, an idea which appears to be derived from late antique art and which appeared frequently in Coptic art. This motif continued to be used in the architecture of Cairo during later periods. Window grilles were made of stucco fashioned into geometric or floral motifs and, for the first time, they are inset with glass. The use of marble decoration is also documented, but no examples have been preserved in the surviving buildings from this period. Figural representations, which are frequently found on surviving objects of Fatimid art, were likely also a feature of decoration in the now-vanished Fatimid palaces, though probably not in religious architecture where their presence would have been taboo. It is generally believed that the painted decoration of the muqarnas ceiling of the Norman-built Cappella Palatina (12th century) in Palermo, Sicily, which includes figural images, was adopted from the style and techniques of the Fatimid court.

== Palaces ==
The palaces of the Fatimid caliphs, their greatest architectural achievements, have been destroyed and are known only from written descriptions and archeological evidence.

=== Palaces of Mahdiya ===
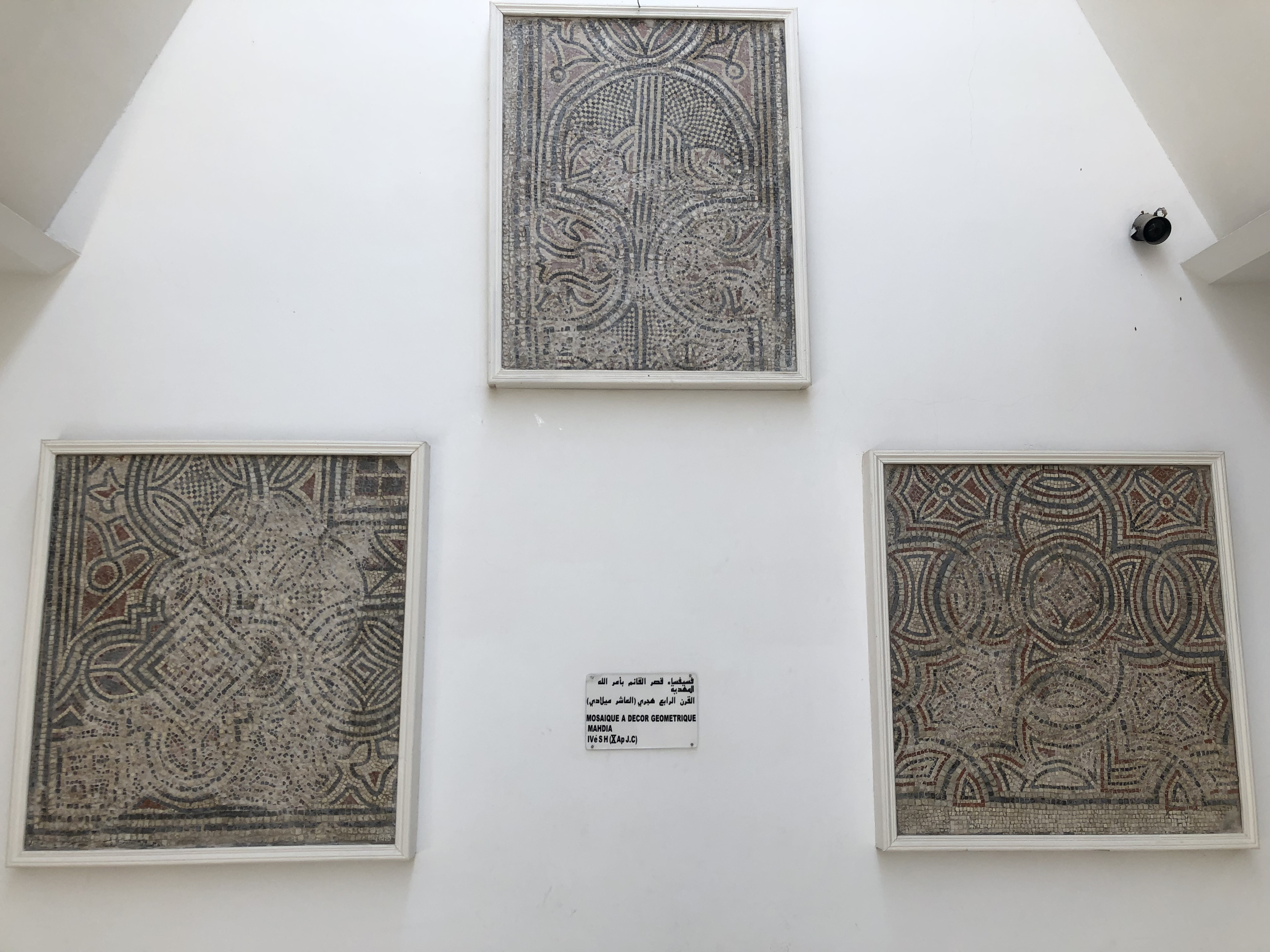
Fragments of mosaic pavement from the palace of al-Qa'im in Mahdiya, showing geometric motifs (at the Mahdia Museum)

Historical sources describe Mahdiya as having multiple Fatimid palaces. From the city's main gate a central avenue led to a public square surrounded by three palaces. The palace on the east side, called the Dar al-'Amma, was used for official purposes. Another to the north was the private palace of Caliph al-Mahdi, and another to the south was for his son, Abu'l-Qasim (later enthroned as al-Qa'im). Unlike most palatial cities of the time, these palaces were located close to the coast, overlooking the sea. One of the palaces had a Great Hall, known as the Iwan al-Kabir ("Great Iwan"). Another reception hall, the Majlis al-Baḥr ("Hall of the Sea" or "Maritime Hall") was built next to the harbour itself to host receptions related to the Fatimid navy. The palaces were all built in high-quality white limestone, which was available locally. Some probable fragments of the palace have been found in the city: some columns and capitals were found re-used in later houses and a large mosaic pavement has been excavated. The mosaic pavement features geometric motifs.

Of the three main palaces, only remains of the southern palace have been found. It measured around 85 by 100 metres (279 by 328 ft) and had round corner towers and semi-round buttresses along its outer walls. Inside, it probably had a large central courtyard, though few remains of this have been uncovered. On the north side of this courtyard was a large reception hall of rectangular shape divided into three naves by two rows of pillars or columns. At the back end of the central nave was a small apse where the throne of the crown prince probably stood. Reception halls or throne halls with a similar layout were found in the older Aghlabid palace at Raqqada and in the later Cordoban Umayyad palatial city of Madinat al-Zahra. According to scholar Felix Arnold, the proportions of this hall correspond to an equilateral triangle, with the throne apse situated at one corner of this triangle. Arnold suggests that the equilateral triangle, which was often employed by Islamic artists and architects, was important because its proportions provided the figure on the throne (at one end of the triangle) with an optimal field of view over the rest of the hall. Similar proportions are found in later throne halls in the western Islamic regions, including those of Madinat al-Zahra, but this is the earliest known application of this design in the region.

=== Sabra al-Mansuriyya ===
In 946 the Fatimids began construction of the new capital named al-Mansuriyya (after its founder, the third Fatimid caliph al-Mansur), at a site called Sabra near Kairouan. Unlike Mahdiya, which was built with more strategic and defensive considerations in mind, al-Mansuriyya was built as a display of power and as a base to generate wealth for the growing Fatimid state. The city had a round layout with the caliph's palace at the center, possibly modeled on the Round City of Baghdad. Only sparse remains of the city have been preserved today, as after its abandonment in the 11th century the site was pillaged for its building materials. It appears to have differed from earlier Fatimid palaces in at least one respect its extensive use of water. One excavated structure featured a vast rectangular courtyard mostly occupied by a large pool. At one end of the courtyard was a suite of rooms and two smaller courtyards whose layout has parallels with both earlier Abbasid palaces (such as Ukhaidir) and the halls of Madinat al-Zahra. Al-Mansur's palace is also described by historical sources as facing a large pool of water, in the center of which was another palace connected to it by a footbridge. This use of water was reminiscent of earlier Aghlabid palaces at nearby Raqqada and of contemporary palaces at Madinat al-Zahra, but not of older Umayyad and Abbasid palaces further east, suggesting that displays of waterworks were evolving into symbols of power in this region and period. A contemporary writer, Qadi al-Nu'man, recounted that Caliph al-Mu'izz ordered the transportation of huge antique columns from Sousse to al-Mansuriyya, to be used in the construction of a new "Great Hall". This story is supported by the on-site discovery of fragments of huge columns with a diameter of over 1 metre.

=== Great Palaces of Cairo ===
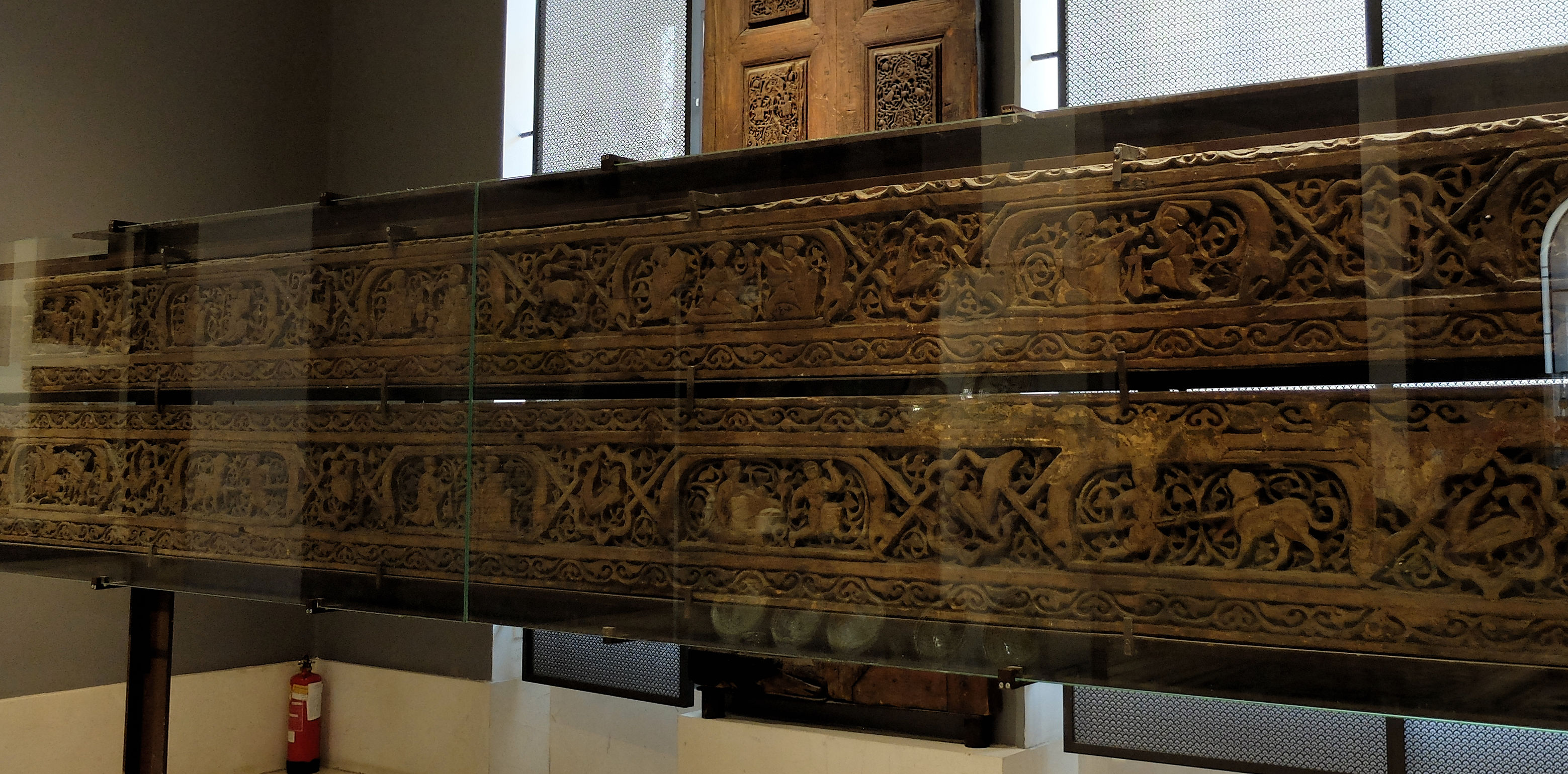
Wooden beams carved with scenes of animals and humans, from the Fatimid Western Palace in Cairo (at the Museum of Islamic Art, Cairo)

The heartland of architectural activity and expression during Fatimid rule was Cairo, where many of the palaces, mosques and other buildings were built. The Caliphs competed with their rivals of the Abbasid and Byzantine empires, and were known to indulge in furnishing their palaces with "extraordinary splendor". The sprawling palatial complex at the heart of Fatimid Cairo consisted of two major palaces: the Eastern Palace or Great Palace (al-Qasr al-Kabir) and the smaller Western Palace or Lesser Palace (Qasr al-Saghir al-Gharbi). The two palaces were separated by a main street that ran roughly north-to-south – the present-day al-Mu'izz Street – and at the center between was a large public square, Bayn al-Qasrayn (literally, "Between the Two Palaces"), which was the heart of the city and a site of certain ceremonies. The grand entrance to the Eastern Palace, the Golden Gate (Bab al-Dhahab), stood on one side of this square. The palace complex was accompanied by a mausoleum or cemetery, Turbat al-Za'faraan ("The Saffron Tomb"), where the caliphs were buried, whose site is occupied today by the Khan el-Khalili market. In the 12th century, near the end of the Fatimid period, the head of Husayn was transferred from Ascalon and housed in a shrine (now part of Al-Hussein Mosque) inside the cemetery.

The palaces had gold rafters to support the ceilings and Caliphs typically asked for a golden throne encased with a curtain similar to those of the rulers of the Abbasids and Byzantines. Furniture and ceramics were elegantly adorned with motifs of birds and animals which were said to bring good luck, and depictions of hunters, and musicians and dancers of the court which reflected the exuberance of Fatimid palace life. Figural representations are believed to have been incorporated into the architectural decoration itself, as evidence by some surviving examples of woodwork from the palaces. Fountains were installed in the palaces to cool the atmosphere.

=== Other Fatimid-era palaces ===
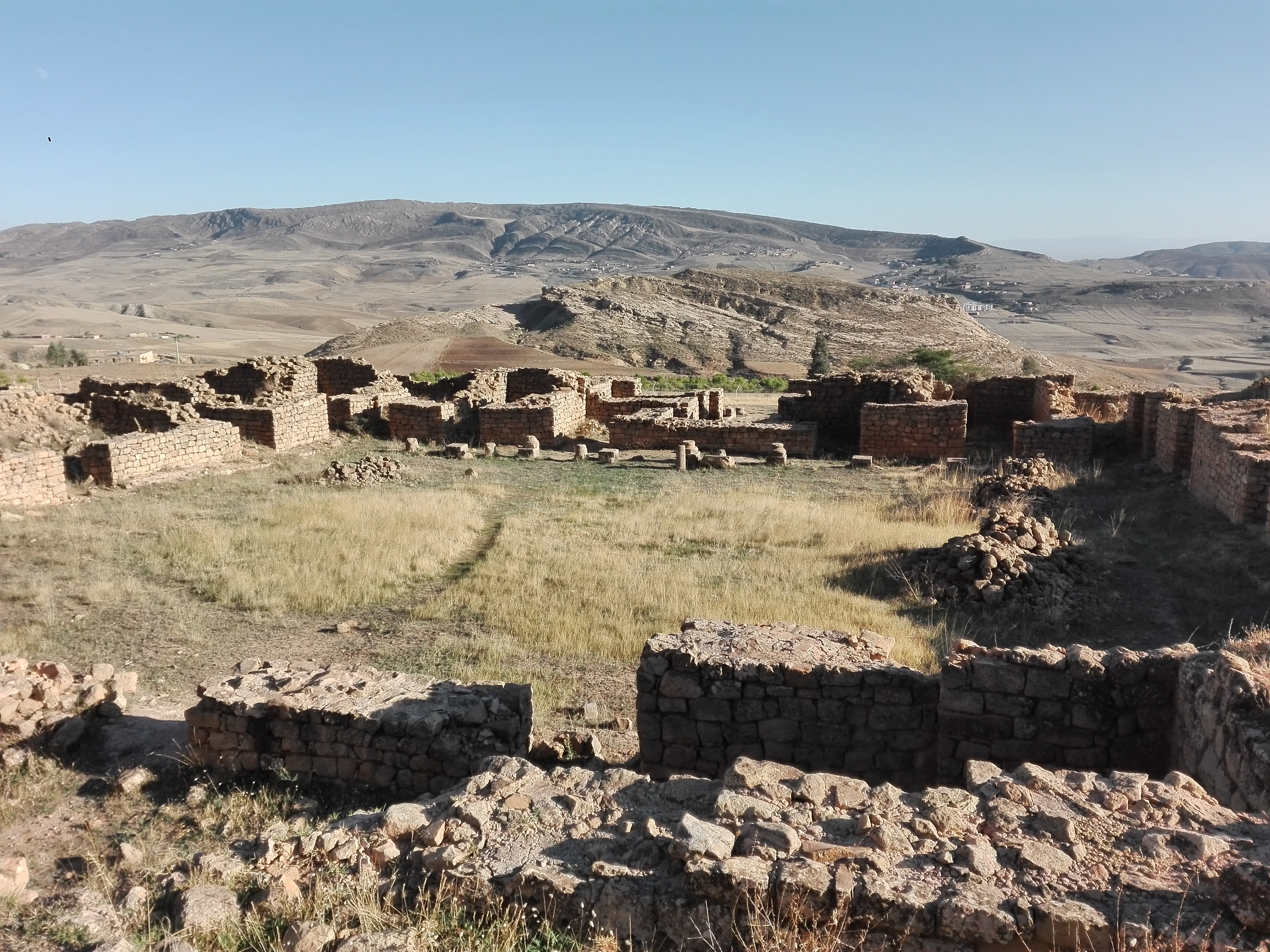
Remains of the palace at 'Ashir, the residence founded by Ziri ibn Manad in 934

In North Africa, the Fatimids also relied on local Berber commanders to govern the western regions of their empire, such as Ziri ibn Manad, the founder of the Zirid dynasty. Ziri's palace at 'Ashir (near the present town of Kef Lakhdar in Algeria) was built in 934 while he was in the service of Caliph al-Qa'im. It is one of the oldest Islamic-era palaces in the Maghreb to have been discovered and excavated. It was built in stone and has a carefully-designed symmetrical plan which included a large central courtyard and two smaller courtyards in each of the side wings of the palace. Some scholars believe this design imitated the now-lost Fatimid palaces of Mahdia.

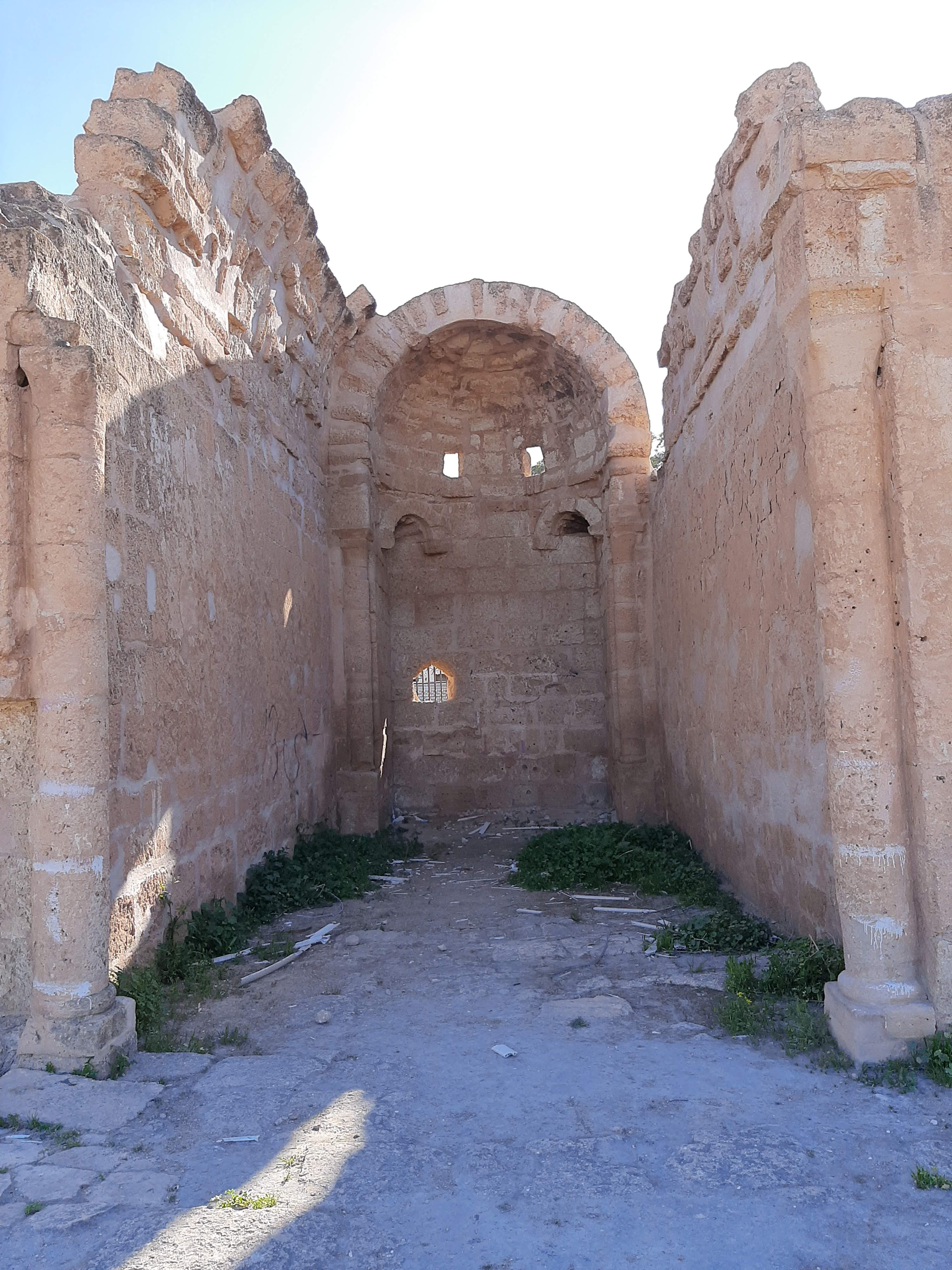
Remains of the Fatimid palace in Ajdabiya

Another Fatimid palace has also been documented in Ajdabiya, present-day Libya. Its walls were still mostly standing in the early 19th century and its remains were excavated by archeologists in 1952. The archeologists who studied it suggested that the palace was a kind of base camp for Abu'l-Qasim before he was enthroned as the Caliph al-Qa'im. The palace, known locally as al-Qaṣr al-Muḫaṣṣa, is relatively small, measuring 22 by 33 metres (72 by 108 ft). It was built in white limestone, like the palaces of Mahdiya. It had a rectangular layout with round towers at its corners and a square tower at the middle of its two longer sides. Inside, it has a central square courtyard onto which opens a reception hall consisting of an elongated iwan, about 7.1 metres (23 ft) high, finishing in an apse-like projection at the back. The apse, which still partially stands today, was covered by a semi-dome with squinches.

== Mosques ==
The plan and decoration of Fatimid mosques reflect Shiite doctrine and that the mosques were often used for royal ceremonial purposes. The characteristic architectural styles of Fatimid mosques include portals that protrude from the wall, domes in front of mihrabs and qibla walls, porches and arcades with keel-shaped arches supported by a series of columns, façade ornamentation with iconographic inscriptions and stucco decorations. The mosques followed the hypostyle plan, where a central courtyard was surrounded by arcades with their roofs usually supported by keel arches, initially resting on columns with Corinthian capitals. The arches held inscription bands, a style that is unique to Fatimid architecture. The later columns often had a bell-shaped capital with the same shape mirrored to form the base. The prayer niche was architecturally more elaborate, with features such as a dome or transept. The Fatimid architects built modified versions of Coptic keel-arched niches with radiating fluted hoods, and later extended the concept to fluted domes. The woodwork of the doors and interiors of the buildings was often finely carved.

Early Fatimid mosques such as the Great Mosque of Mahdiya and the mosque of the Qarafa did not have a minaret. Scholar Jonathan Bloom and others have argued that the early Fatimids rejected such structures because they were seen as unnecessary innovations that were symbolically associated with Abbasid architecture at the time. Later mosques built in Egypt and in Ifriqiya incorporated brick minarets, which were probably part of their original designs. These were derived from early Abbasid forms of minaret. Minarets later evolved to the characteristic mabkhara (incense burner) shape, where a lower rectangular shaft supported an octagon section that was capped by a ribbed helmet. Almost all of Cairo's Fatimid minarets were destroyed by an earthquake in 1303.

Some "floating" mosques were located above shops. For the first time, the façade of the mosque was aligned with the street and was elaborately decorated. The decorations were in wood, stucco and stone, including marble, with geometrical and floral patterns and arabesques with Samarran and Byzantine origins. The decorations were more complex than the earlier Islamic forms and more carefully adapted to structural constraints. The imposing architecture and decoration of Fatimid buildings such as the al-Hakim Mosque provided a backdrop that supported the dual role of the Fatimid caliph as both religious and political leader.

=== Great Mosque of Mahdiya ===
The Great Mosque of Mahdiya was built in Mahdia, Tunisia, in 916 CE (303–304 in the Islamic calendar), on an artificial platform "reclaimed from the sea" as mentioned by the Andalusian geographer Al-Bakri, after the founding of the city in 909 by the first Fatimid imam, Abdullah al-Mahdi Billah. Internally, the Great Mosque had a layout similar to other mosques in the region. A transverse aisle paralleled the qibla wall, with nine aisles at right angles to the transverse. Like other mosques in the region, the orientation of the qibla differs significantly from the "true" great circle route to Mecca. In the 11th century, the original qibla wall was destroyed by sea erosion and had to be rebuilt, reducing the size of the prayer hall. Today, the mosque is one of the most well-preserved Fatimid monuments in the Maghreb, though it had been extensively damaged over time and was in large part reconstructed by archeologists in the 1960s.

Unlike other North African mosques, the Great Mosque did not have minarets, and had a single imposing entrance. The entrance is the first known example of a projecting monumental porch in a mosque, which may have been derived from the architecture of secular buildings. A Fatimid mosque at Ajdabiya in Libya had a similar plan, although it did not have the same monumental entrance. Like the Mahdiya mosque, for the same ideological reasons, the Ajdabiya mosque did not have a minaret.

Great Mosque of Mahdiya

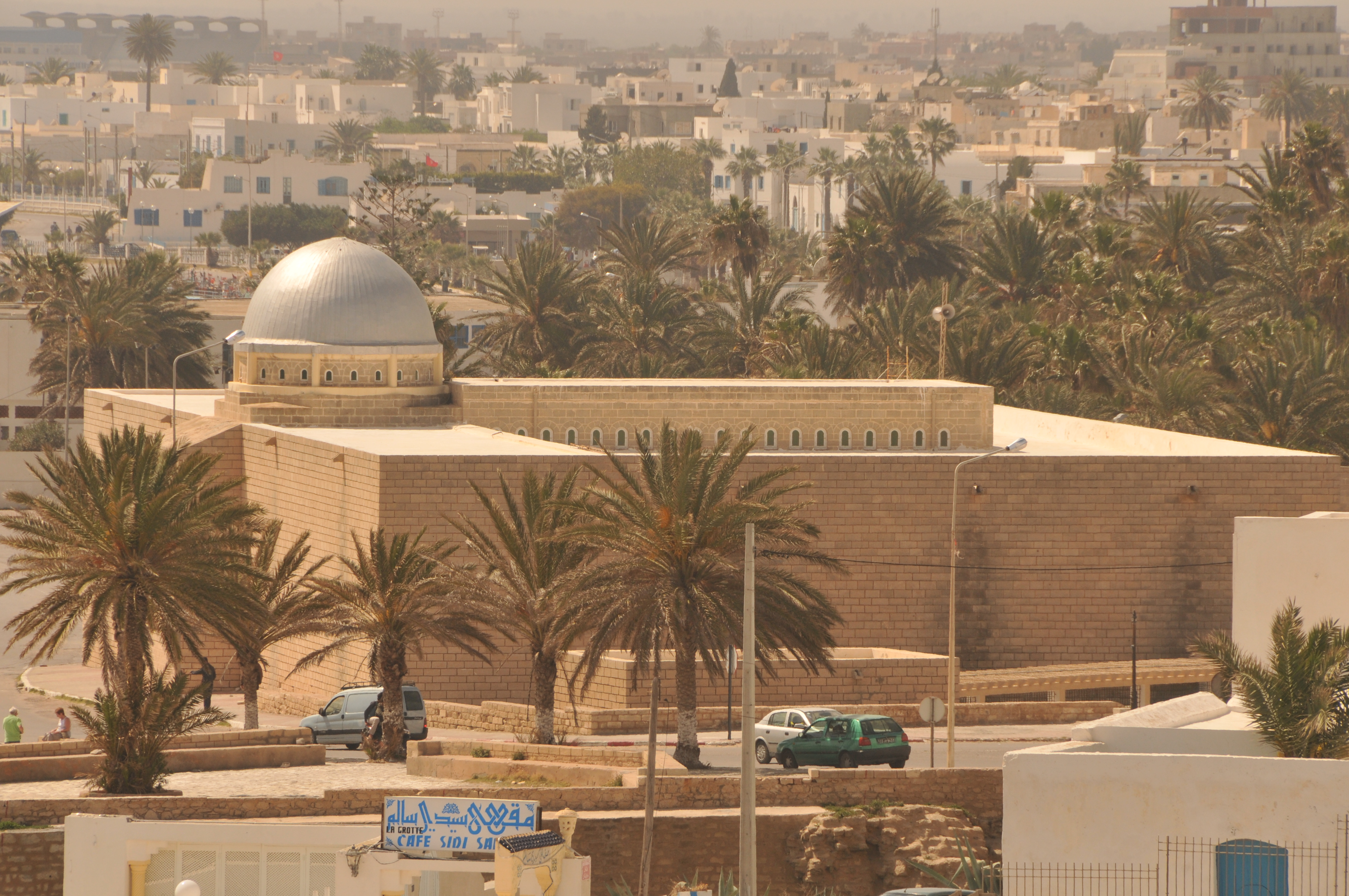
Great Mosque of Mahdiya, Tunisia

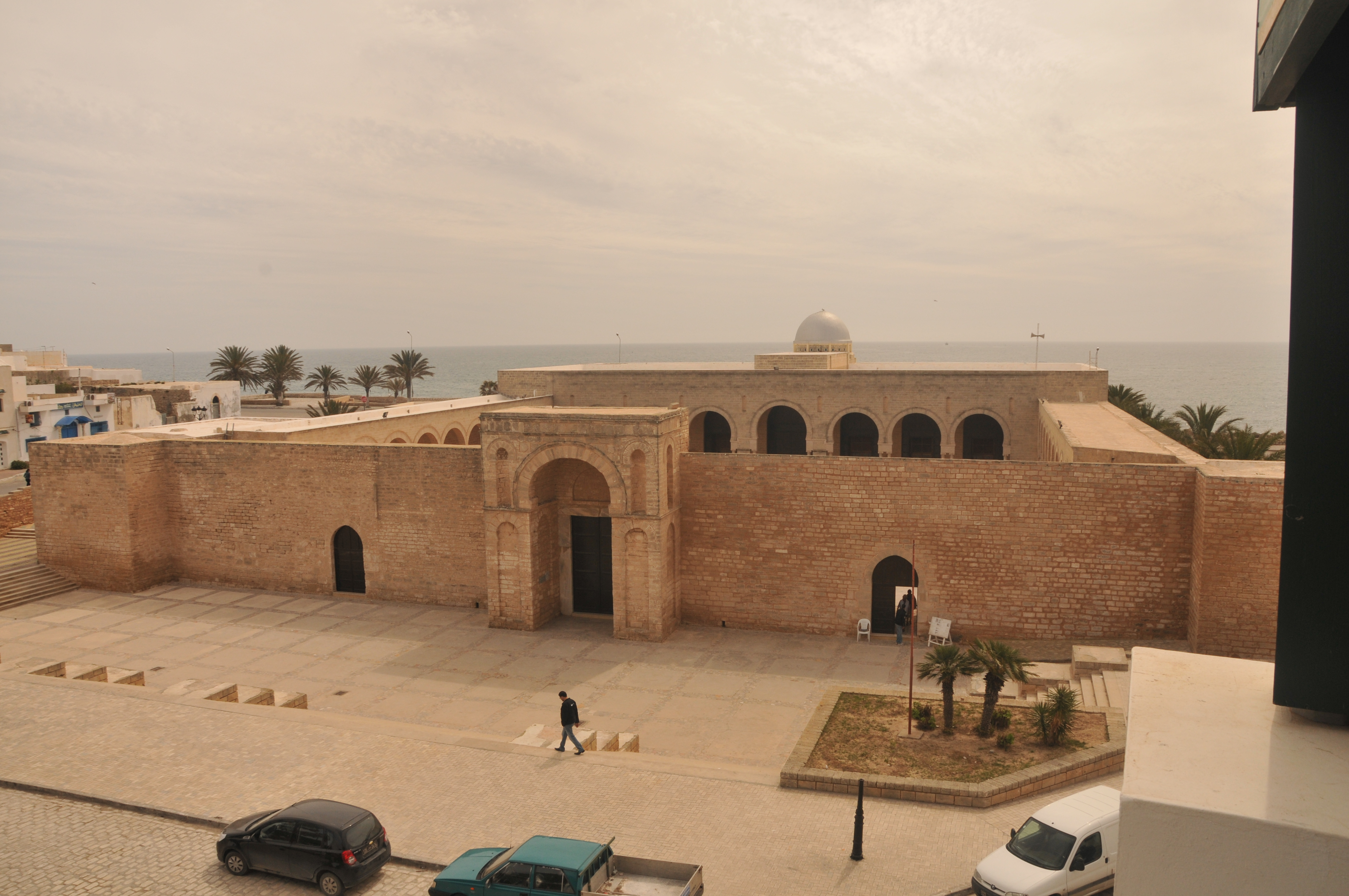
Front view of the Great Mosque of Mahdiya, with projecting entrance visible

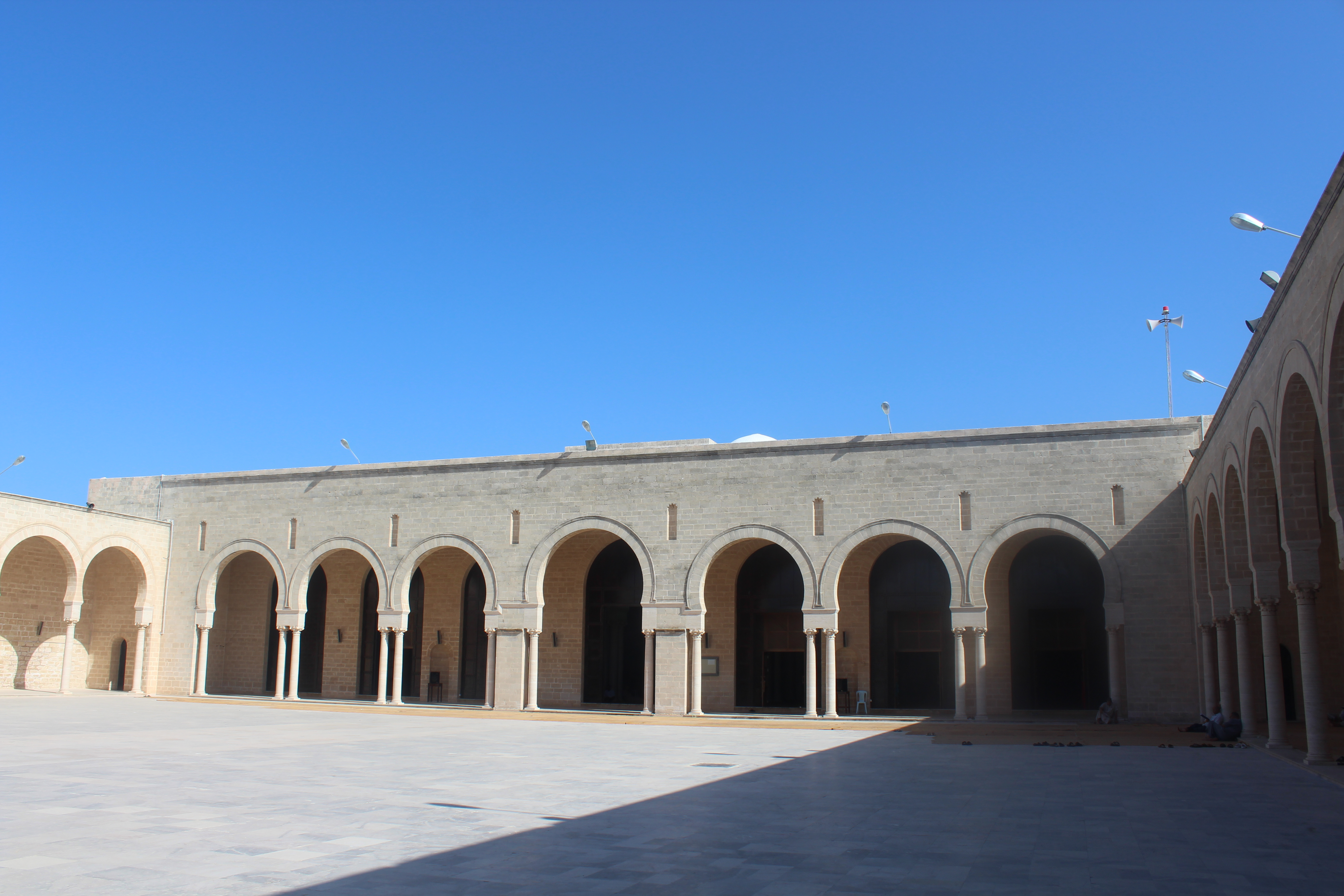
Interior courtyard of the mosque

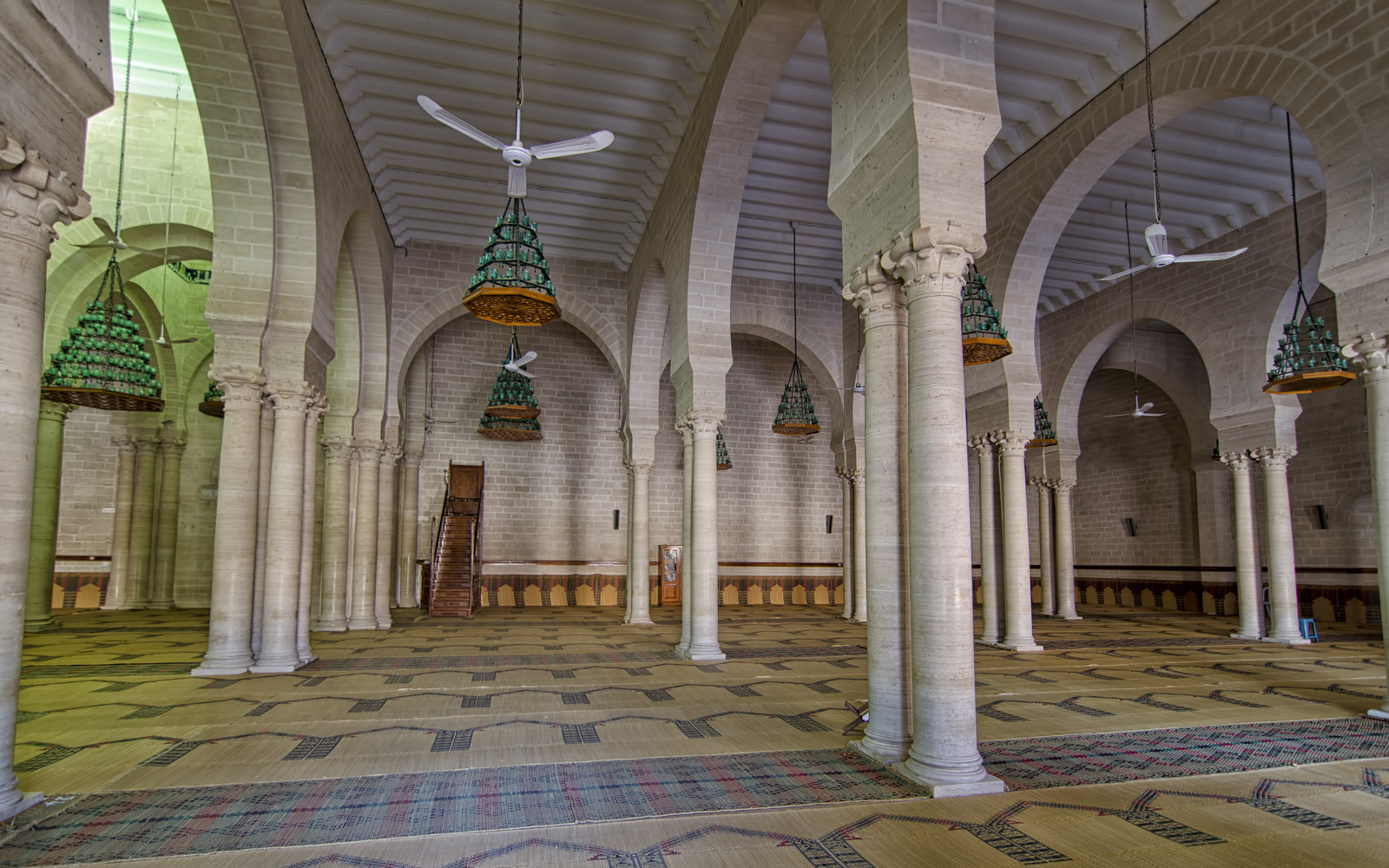
Interior of the prayer hall, showing arcaded aisles with grouped columns

=== Al-Azhar Mosque ===
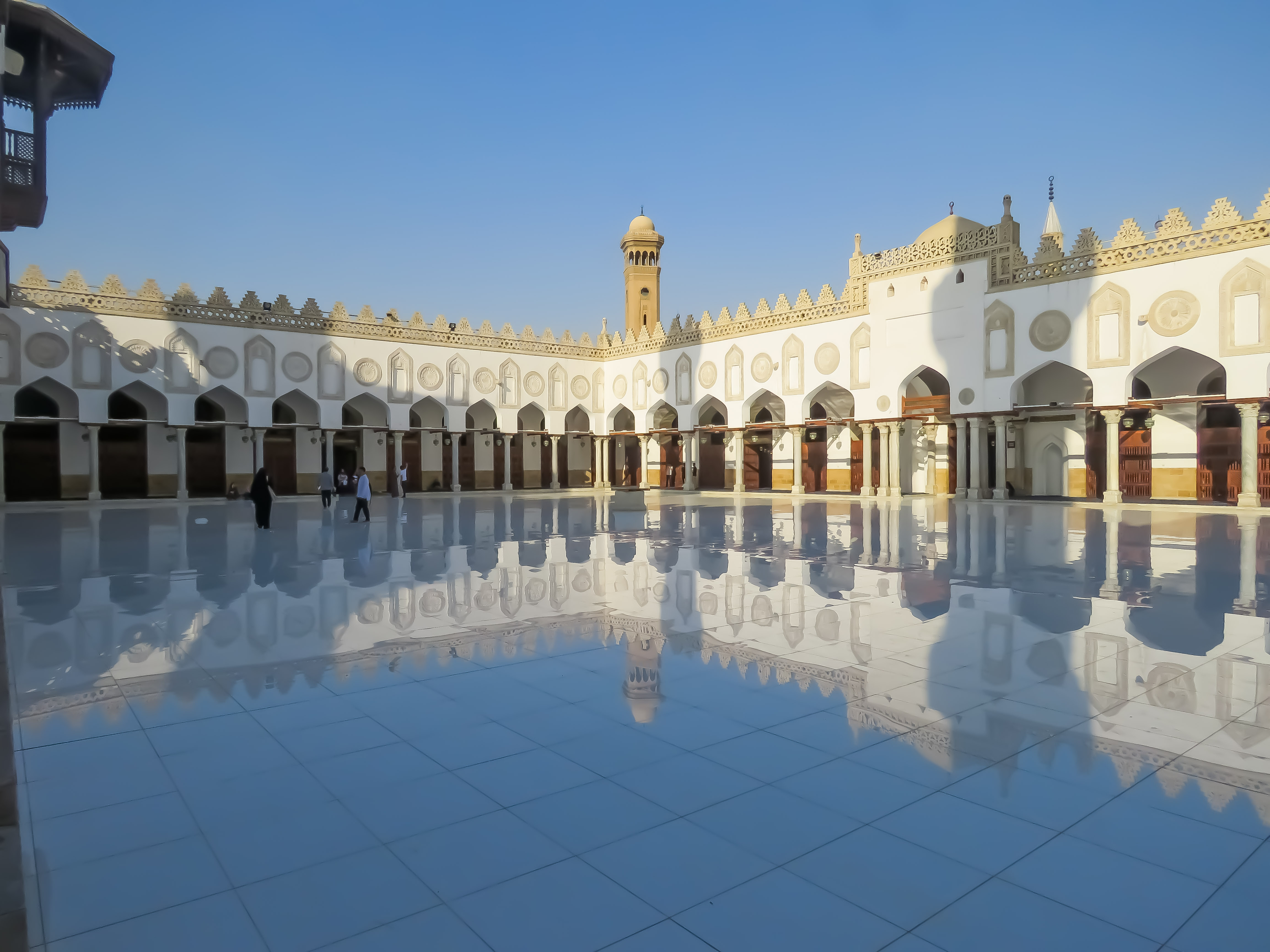
Courtyard of the Al Azhar Mosque, Cairo

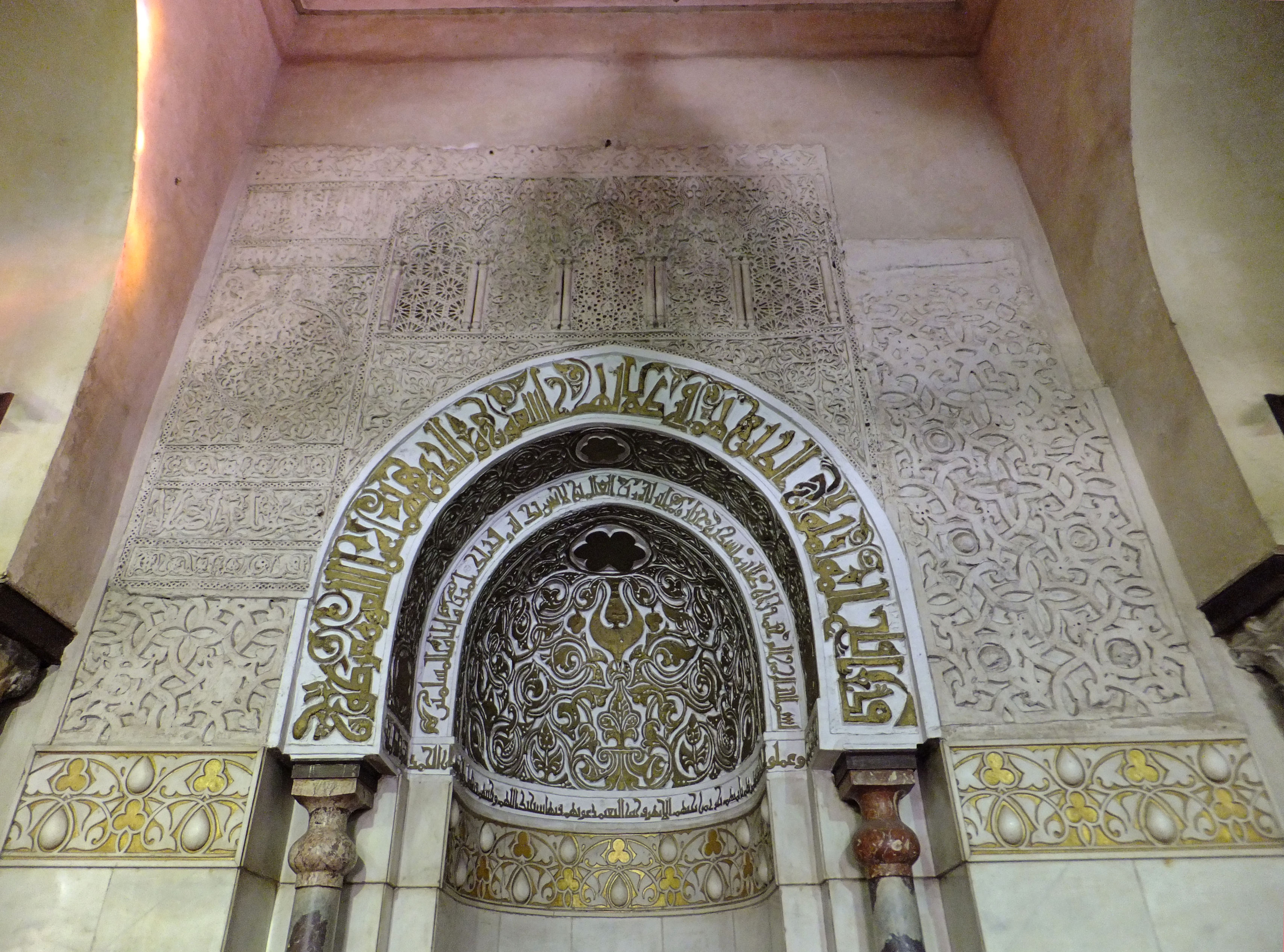
Original mihrab of the Al-Azhar Mosque (Note: The carved stucco inside the mihrab's niche dates from the Fatimid period, but the stucco on the wall around it dates from a later Mamluk restoration by Sayf al-Din Salar after 1303.)

The Al-Azhar Mosque was commissioned by the Caliph al-Mu'izz li-Din Allah for the newly established capital city of Cairo. Its named after Fatimah, the daughter of Muhammad. Jawhar al-Siqilli, commander of the Fatimid army started construction of the mosque in 970. It was the first mosque established in the city. (Note: The congregational Mosque of Amr ibn al-As is the oldest mosque in modern Cairo, built in 640–641. However, the Mosque of Amr ibn al-As was built in the camp of Fustat. Cairo has expanded and now includes Fustat within its borders.) The first prayers were held there in 972, and in 989 the mosque authorities hired 35 scholars, making it a teaching centre for Shia theology. A waqf for the mosque was established in 1009 by Caliph al-Hakim.

The Al-Azhar Mosque in Cairo seems to have had a projecting entrance similar to the Great Mosque of Mahdiya. The original building had an open central courtyard with three arcades. Its layout was similar to the Kairouan and Samarra mosques. These had round arches on pre-Islamic columns with Corinthian capitals. There were three domes (indicative of the location of the prayer hall), two at the corners of the qibla wall and one over the prayer niche, and a small brick minaret over the main entrance. The gallery around the courtyard had series of columns and the prayer hall, which had the domes built over it, had five more rows of five pillars.

Minor alterations were made by the caliphs al-Hakim bi-Amr Allah in 1009 and al-Amir bi-Ahkami l-Lah in 1125. The caliph al-Hafiz (1129–1149) made significant further changes, adding a fourth arcade with keel arches, and a dome with elaborate carved stucco decorations in front of the transept. Since then, the mosque has been greatly enlarged and modified over the years. Of the original building little remains other than the arcades and some of the stucco decoration.

=== Mosque of the Qarafa ===
An unusually detailed description of the mosque of the Qarafa in Cairo, built by two noblewomen in 976, has been left by the historian al-Quda'i, who died around 1062–1065. He said,

This mosque had a lovely garden to its west, and a cistern. The door by which one enters has large mastabas. The middle [of the mosque] is under the high manar, which has iron sheets on it. [It runs] from the door right up to the mihrab and the maqsurah. It has fourteen square doors of baked brick. In front of all the doors is a row of arches; each arch rests on two marble columns. There are three ṣufūf. (Note: Suffa / ṣufūf: arcades.) [The interior] is carved in relief and decorated in blue, red, green and other colors, and in certain places, painted in a uniform tone. The ceilings are entirely painted in polychrome; the intrados and the extrados of the arcades supported by columns are covered with paintings of all different colors.

It seems probable from this description that the mosque had a portal that projected from the wall, as did the earlier Great Mosque of Mahdiya. In other respects it seems to have resembled the al-Azhar mosque in layout, architecture and decoration. Although the geographers al-Muqaddasi and Ibn Hawqal both praised this mosque, neither left specific descriptions of this or any other mosque. Thus Ibn Hawqal says of it only that, "It is one of the mosques distinguished by the spaciousness of its court, elegance of construction, and the fineness of its ceilings."

=== Al-Hakim Mosque ===
The Al-Hakim Mosque is named after Imam Al-Hakim bi-Amr Allah (985–1021), the third Fatimid caliph to rule in Egypt. Construction of the mosque started in 990 under Caliph al-Aziz. In 1002–3 Caliph al-Hakim ordered completion of the building. The southern minaret has an inscription with his name and the date of 393 (1003). Significant changes were made to the minarets in 1010, when the original towers were encased inside the large cuboid bastions seen today. At first the mosque was outside the city walls, but when Badr al-Jamali rebuilt the walls he enclosed a larger area, and the north wall of the mosque became part of the new stone city wall. The mosque was badly damaged in the 1303 earthquake, and suffered further damage in later years. By the nineteenth century it was ruined, but it was heavily reconstructed in the 1980s.

The mosque is an irregular rectangle with four arcades that surround the courtyard. As with the Ibn Tulun Mosque, the arches are pointed and rest on brick piers. It resembles the al-Azhar mosque in having three domes along the qibla wall, one at each corner and one over the mihrab. Also like al-Azhar, the prayer hall is crossed by a transept at right angles to the qibla. This wide and tall central aisle leading to the prayer niche borrows from the Mahdiya mosque's design. The al-Hakim mosque differs from the al-Azhar and Ibn Tulun mosques in having two stone minarets at the corners of the stone façade, which has a monumental projecting portal like the Mosque of Mahdiya.

Al-Hakim Mosque

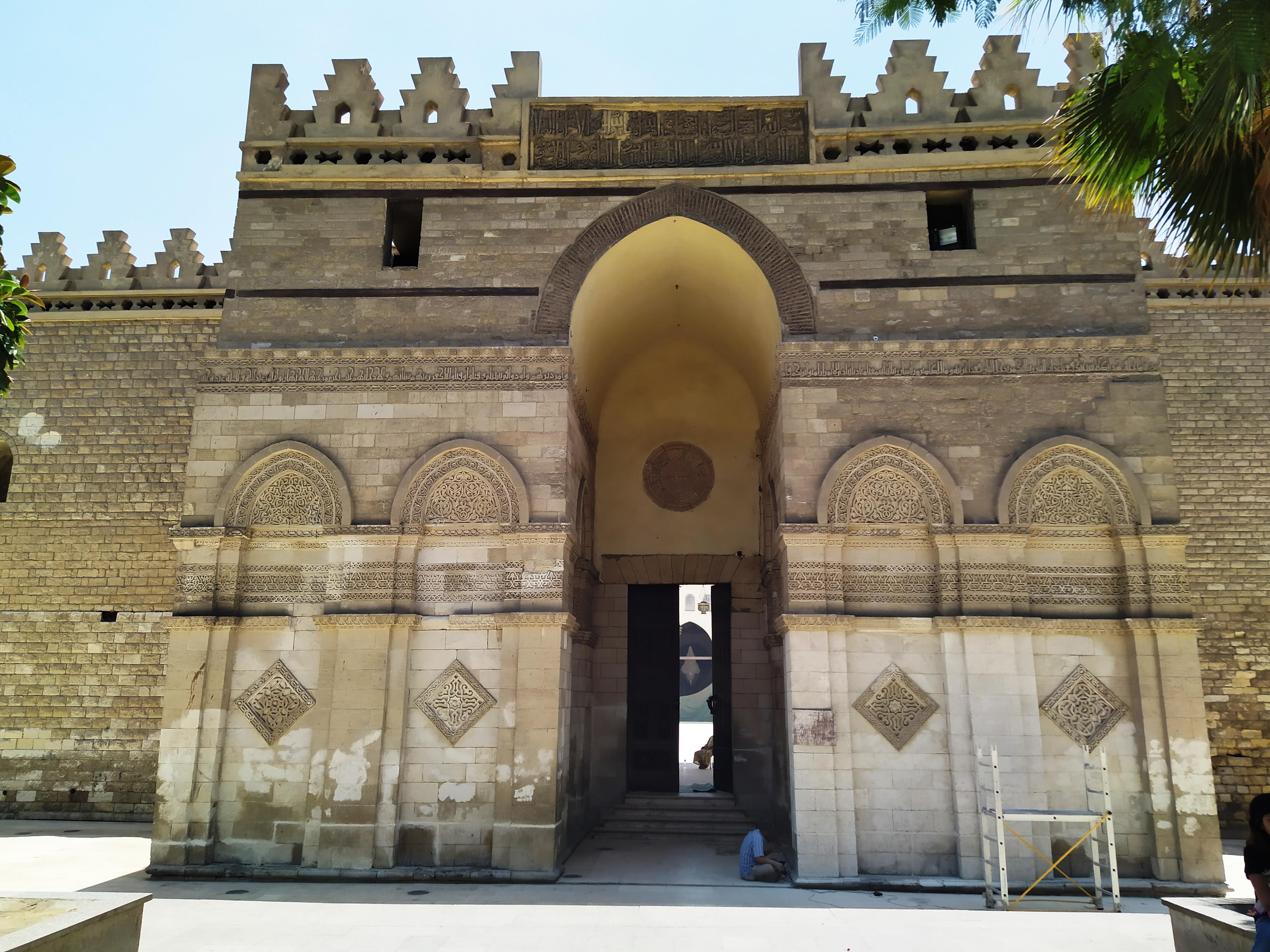
Entrance portal of the al-Hakim Mosque, Cairo (modern reconstruction)

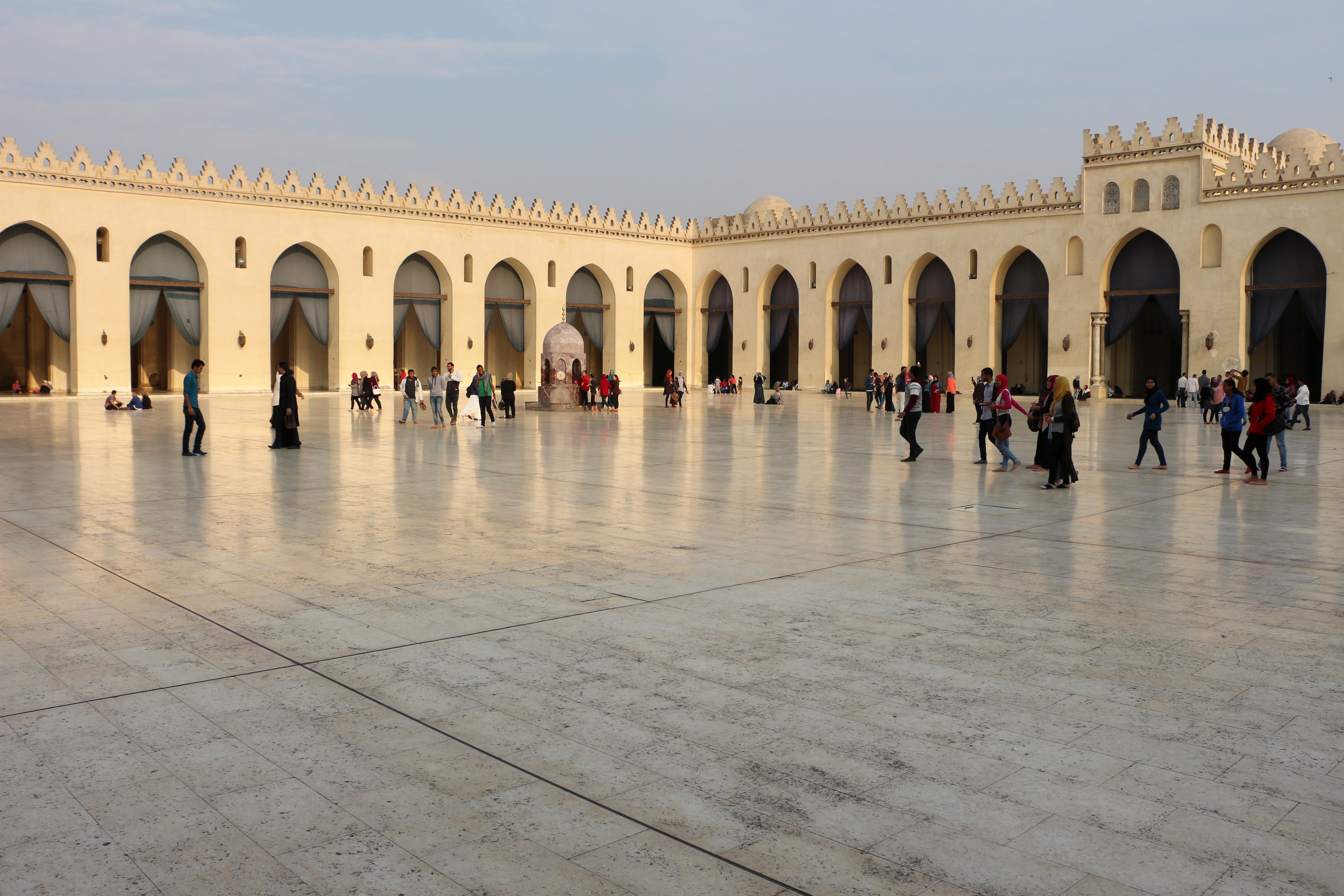
Interior courtyard of the mosque

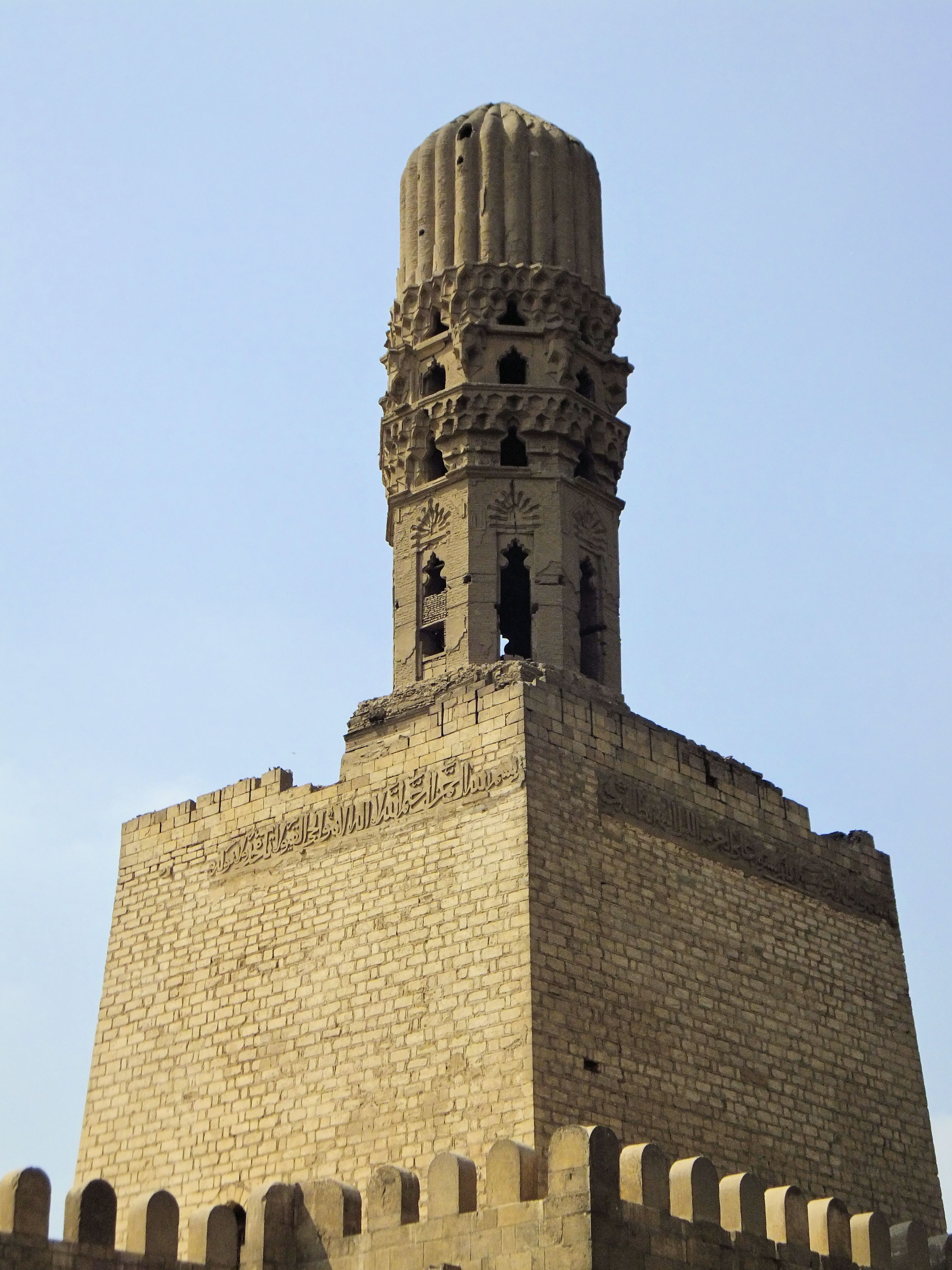
One of the two minarets: the cuboid bastion below dates from 1010, while the top is a 14th-century Mamluk reconstruction.

=== Al-Aqmar Mosque ===
The Aqmar Mosque was built in 1125 on the orders of vizier al-Ma'mun al-Bata'ihi during the caliphate of Imam Al-Amir bi-Ahkam Allah. The mosque is located on al-Muizz Street, north of Bayn al-Qasrayn, formerly adjacent to the palace of the Fatimid caliphs. It is notable for its façade, which is elaborately decorated with inscriptions, blind arches, muqarnas, and other symbols. It is the first mosque in Cairo to have such external decoration and also the first whose external façade is at a different angle than the alignment of the mosque's interior (which is oriented to the qibla) in order to follow the alignment of the street. The interior of the mosque consists of a small courtyard surrounded by arcaded galleries and a hypostyle prayer hall. The arches are of keel shape and those facing the courtyard retain some of their original stucco decoration of Kufic inscriptions on arabesque backgrounds. The mosque's minaret was added later during the Mamluk period. The building underwent a major renovation and reconstruction in the late 20th century, from which originate the present-day mihrab and the right-side (southern) half of the exterior façade.

Al-Aqmar Mosque

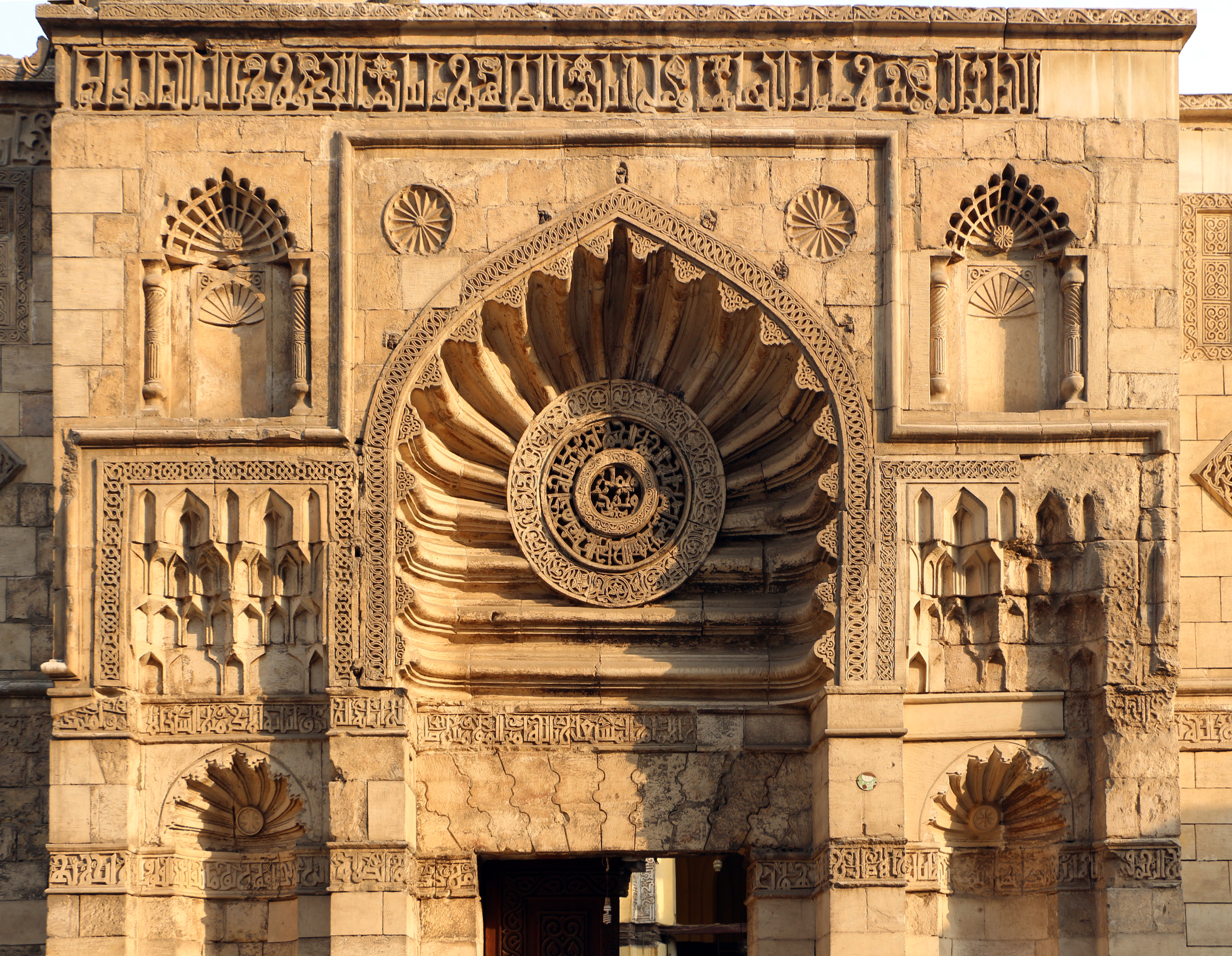
Exterior façade of al-Aqmar Mosque

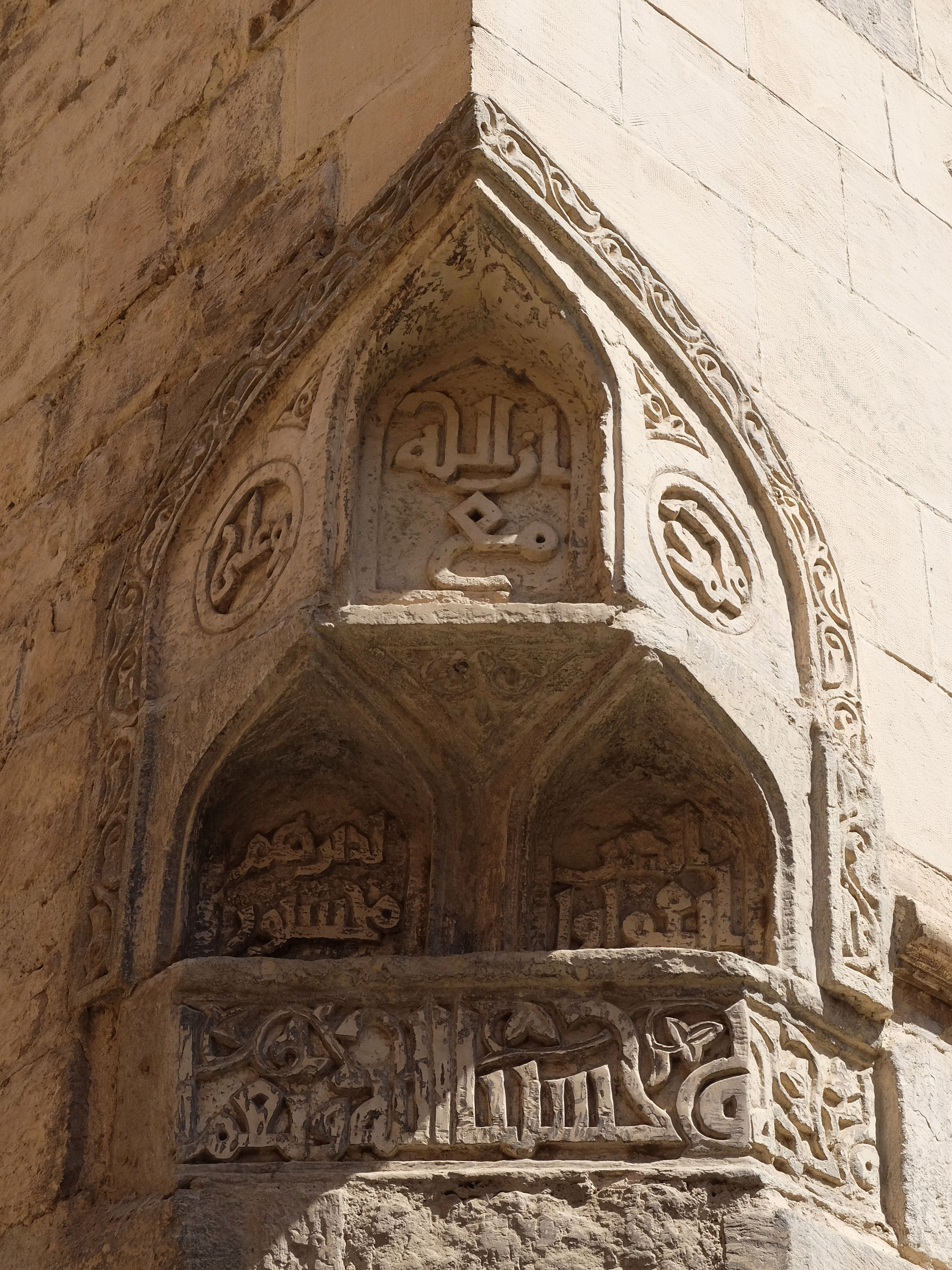
Chamfered corner of al-Aqmar Mosque

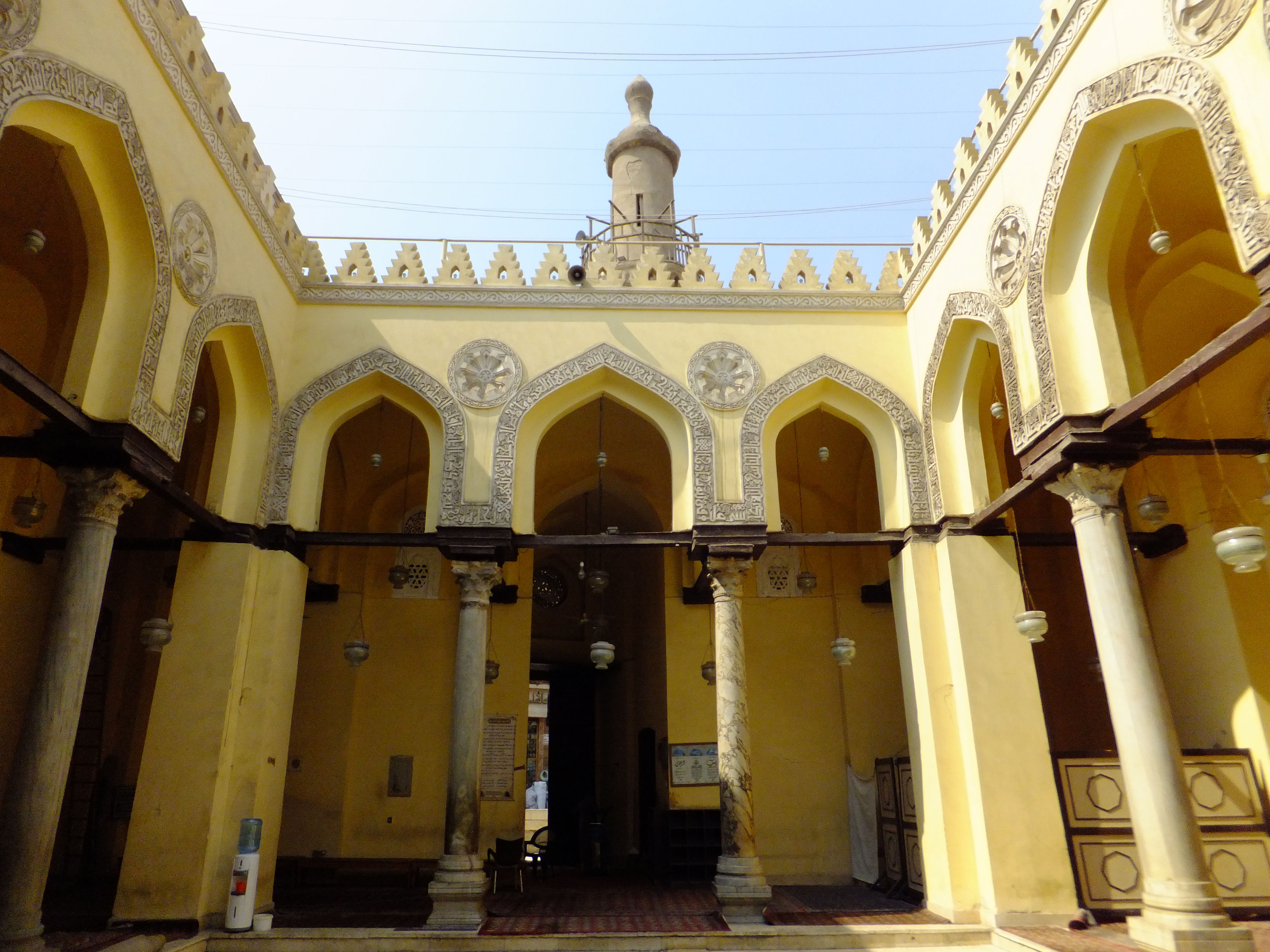
Interior of al-Aqmar Mosque, courtyard and arches

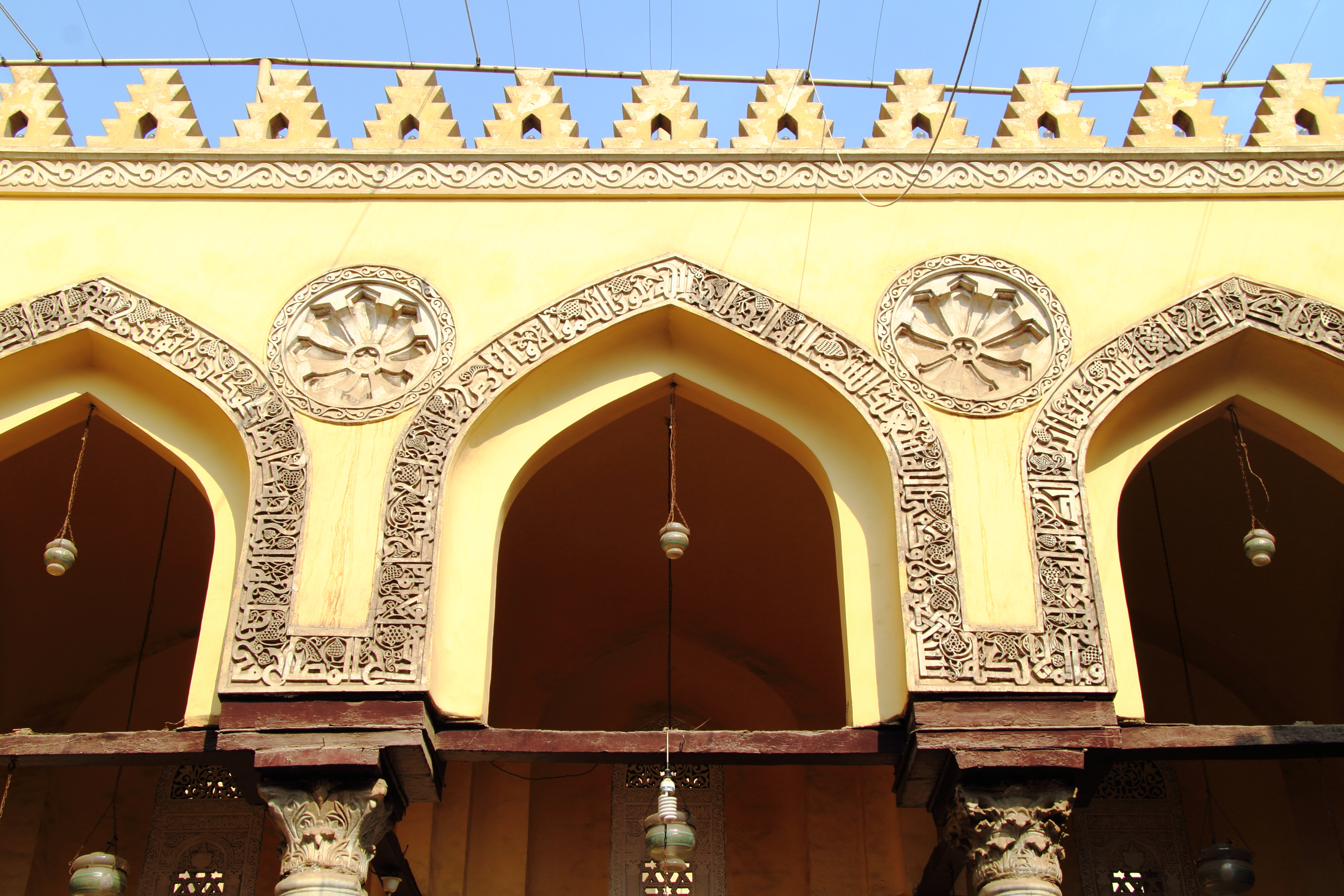
Detail of the keel arches and stucco decoration

=== Other Cairo mosques ===
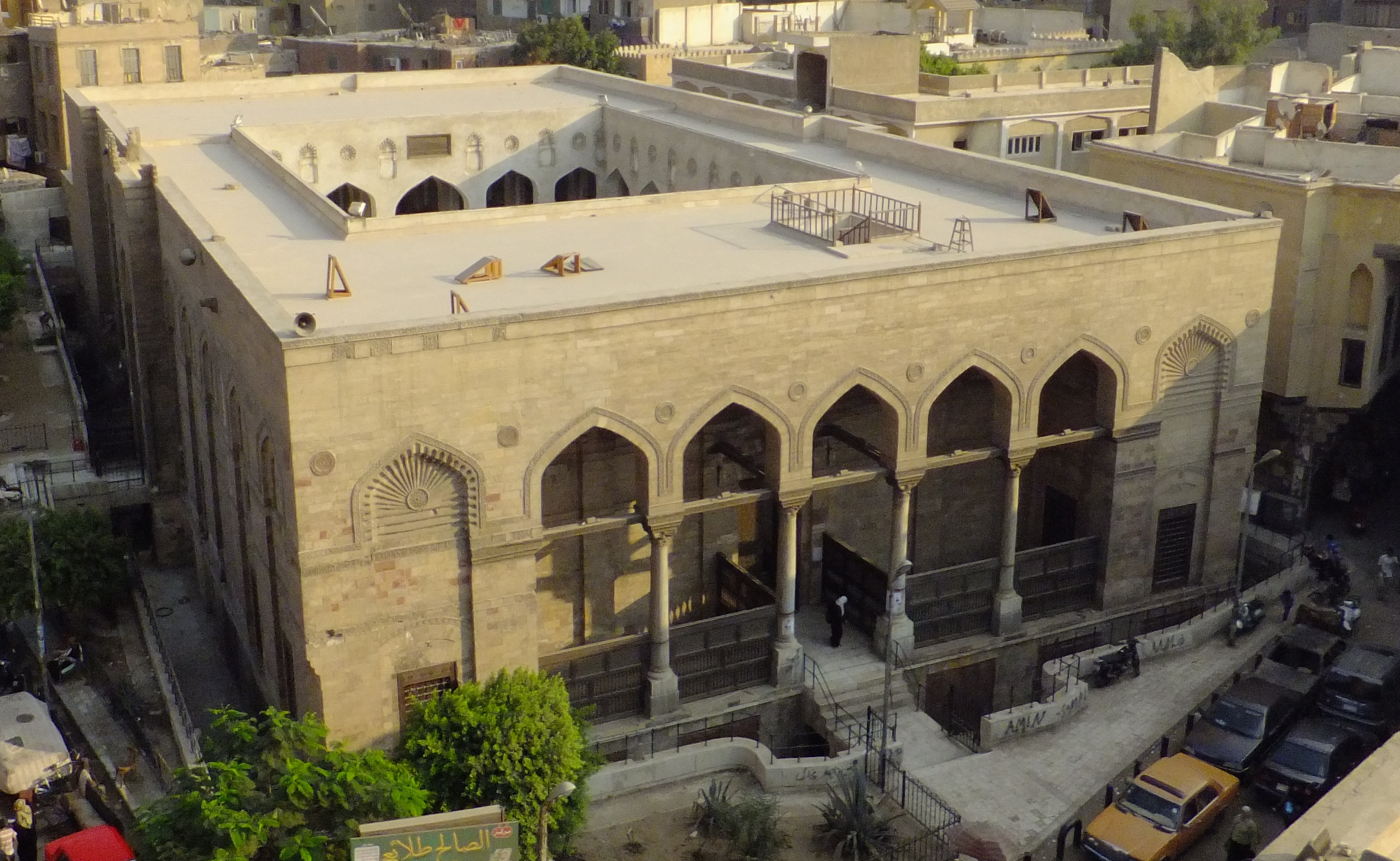
Mosque of al-Salih Tala'i in Cairo (1160)

The Lulua Mosque, located in the southern cemetery of the Moqattam hills, was built in 1015–16 during the reign of the third Caliph al-Hakim. The mosque was built on a promontory of limestone and consisted originally of a three-storey tower-like structure built over a rectangular plan. It exhibited typical aspects of the Fatimid architectural style, with portals with slight protrusions, mihrabs and qibla walls, several domes, and columned porches with triple arches or keel-shaped arches. The mosque partially collapsed in 1919, but was later refurbished in 1998 by the Dawoodi Bohras.

The Juyushi Mosque (discussed below in its role as a mashhad) was built by Badr al-Jamali, the "Amir al Juyush" (Commander of Forces) of the Fatimids. The mosque was completed in 1085 under the patronage of the then Caliph and Imam al-Mustansir. It was built on an end of the Moqattam hills which would ensure a view of the Cairo city.

The Mosque of al-Salih Tala'i, located south of Bab Zuweila, was commissioned by the vizier Tala'i ibn Ruzzik in 1160 and is the last surviving major Fatimid monument to be built. The mosque, raised on a platform above the original level of the street, has a familiar hypostyle form inside but features an exterior portico on its front entrance – a feature which was unique in Cairo before the Ottoman period. It was originally intended to act as a new shrine to hold the head of Husayn ibn Ali, but the relic was never transferred and instead remained at the al-Hussein Mosque near the palaces.

=== Al-Aqsa Mosque ===
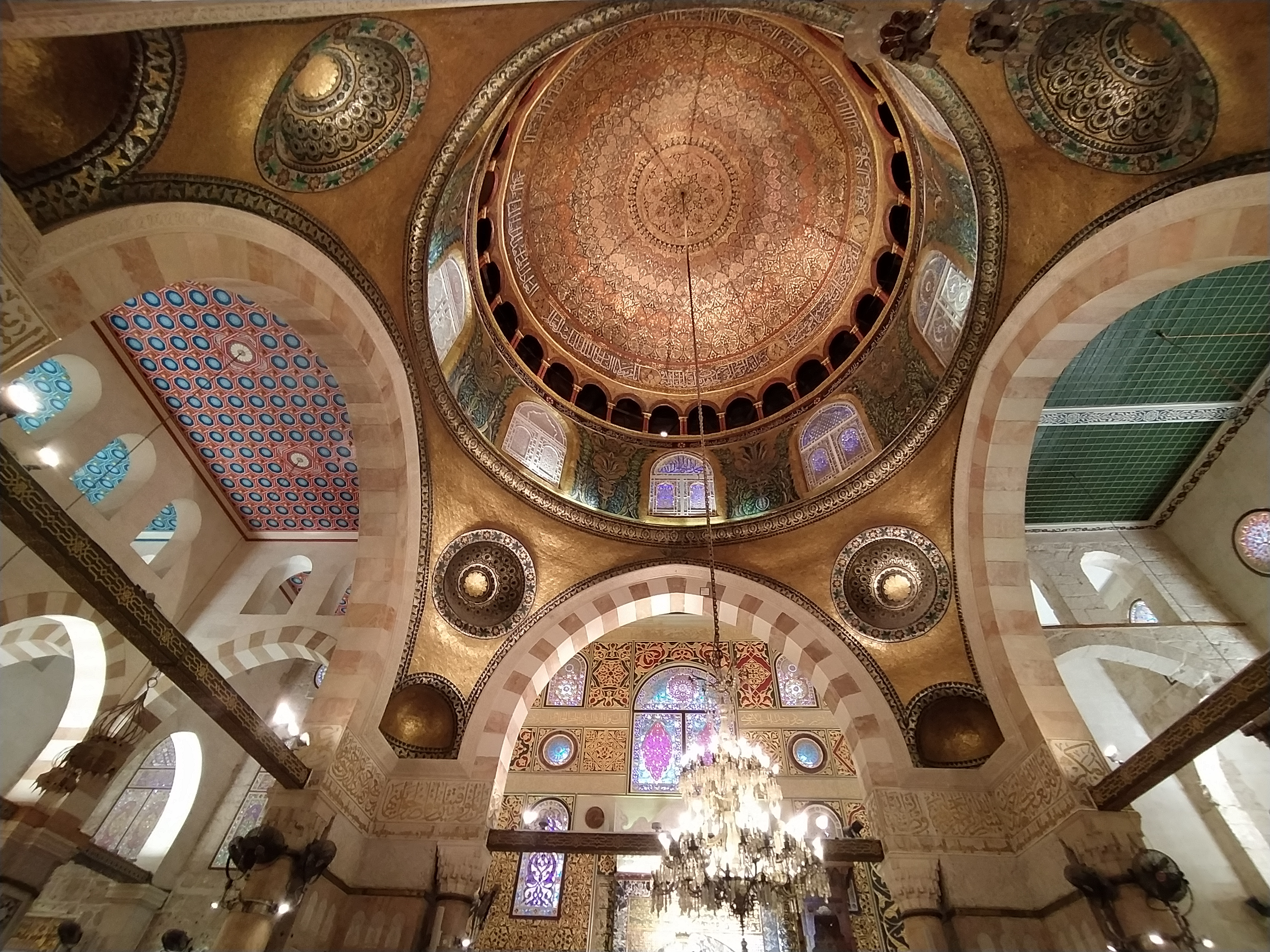
Dome in front of the mihrab in the Al-Aqsa Mosque, including Fatimid-era mosaic and paint decoration

The Fatimids are also credited with the reconstruction of Aqsa Mosque in Jerusalem, which occurred between 1034 and 1036 during the reign of al-Zahir, though work was not completed until 1065 under al-Mustansir. Its layout was much narrower than its previous incarnations, with seven aisles running towards the qibla wall between rows of arches. The present-day mosque still dates in large part to this time, along with much of the decoration around the dome in front of the mihrab. This includes painted decoration inside the dome and mosaics covering the drum, the pendentives, and the archway preceding the dome. Mosaic decoration was uncommon in Islamic architecture at this time and those of the Fatimid reconstruction are inspired by earlier Umayyad-era mosaics, such as those in the nearby Dome of the Rock, depicting luxurious gardens.

== Mausoleums and shrines ==
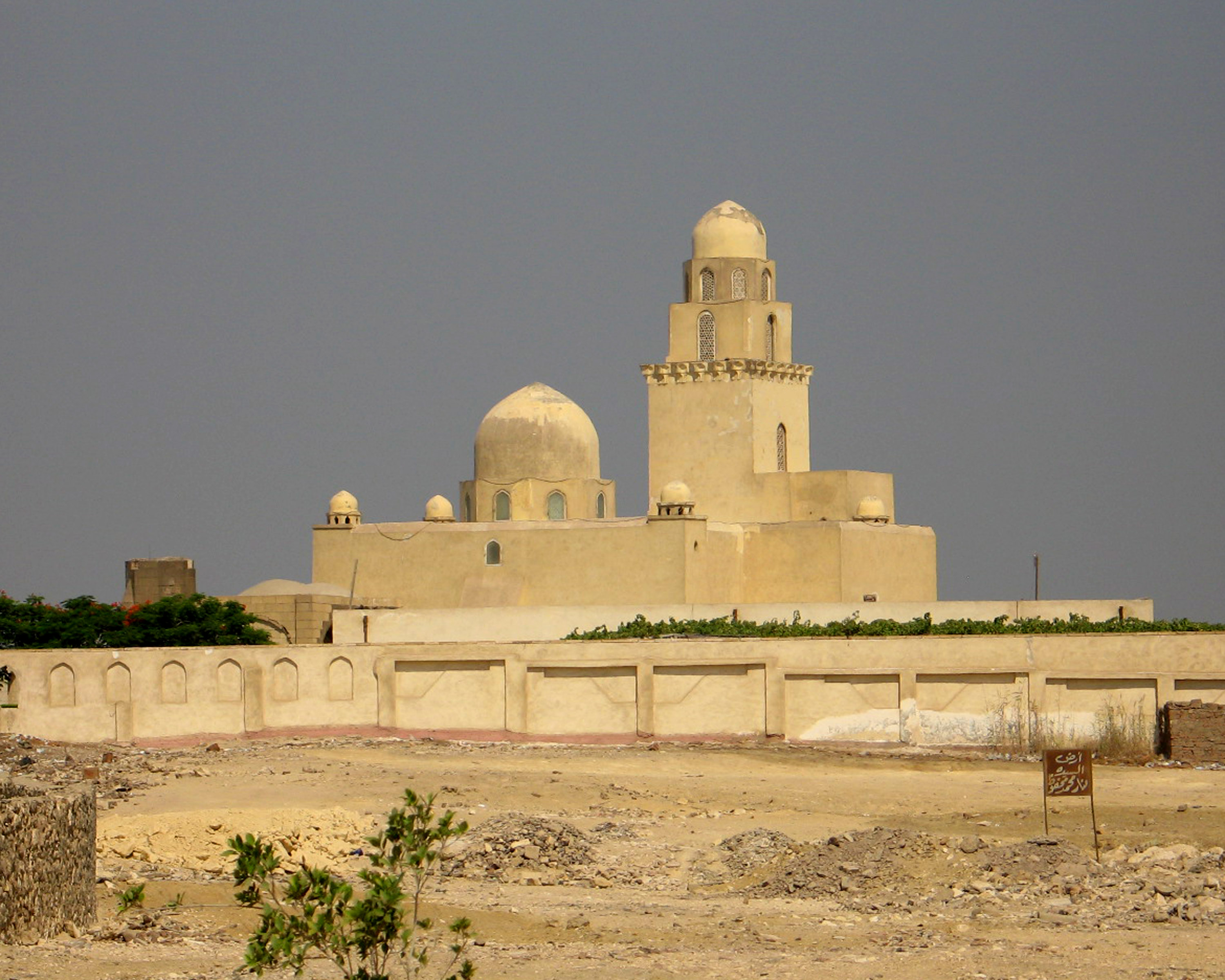
Mashhad of al-Juyushi in Cairo

The mashhad is a characteristic type of Fatimid building, a shrine that commemorates a descendant of Muhammad. The tombs of the Fatimid caliphs were also treated as shrines. Most of the mashhads were straightforward square structures with a dome, but a few of the mausoleums at Aswan were more complex and included side rooms. During the rule of al-Hafiz (r. 1130–1149) several mausoleums and mosques were rebuilt to honour notable female figures in Shi'i history. The caliphs also built tombs for their wives and daughters. Most of the Fatimid mausoleums and mashhads have either been destroyed or have been greatly altered through later renovations.

The Mashad al-Juyushi, dated to 1085, is the most complete mashhad to have survived, although some of its interior details have been erased by a recent restoration. It is not clear whom the mashhad commemorates. The most plausible theory is that the monument commemorates the victories of Badr al-Jamali, whose title, Amir al-Juyush ("Commander of the Armies"), is invoked in the foundation inscription. This building has a prayer hall covered with cross-vaults, with a dome resting on squinches over the area in front of the mihrab. It has a courtyard with a tall square minaret topped by a small domed section. The minaret's overall shape is reminiscent of the older Aghlabid minaret at the Great Mosque of Kairouan (9th century). Its most notable detail is a decorative cornice of muqarnas at the top edge of the square tower shaft, which is the earliest known use of muqarnas in Egypt and among the earliest examples in Islamic architecture.

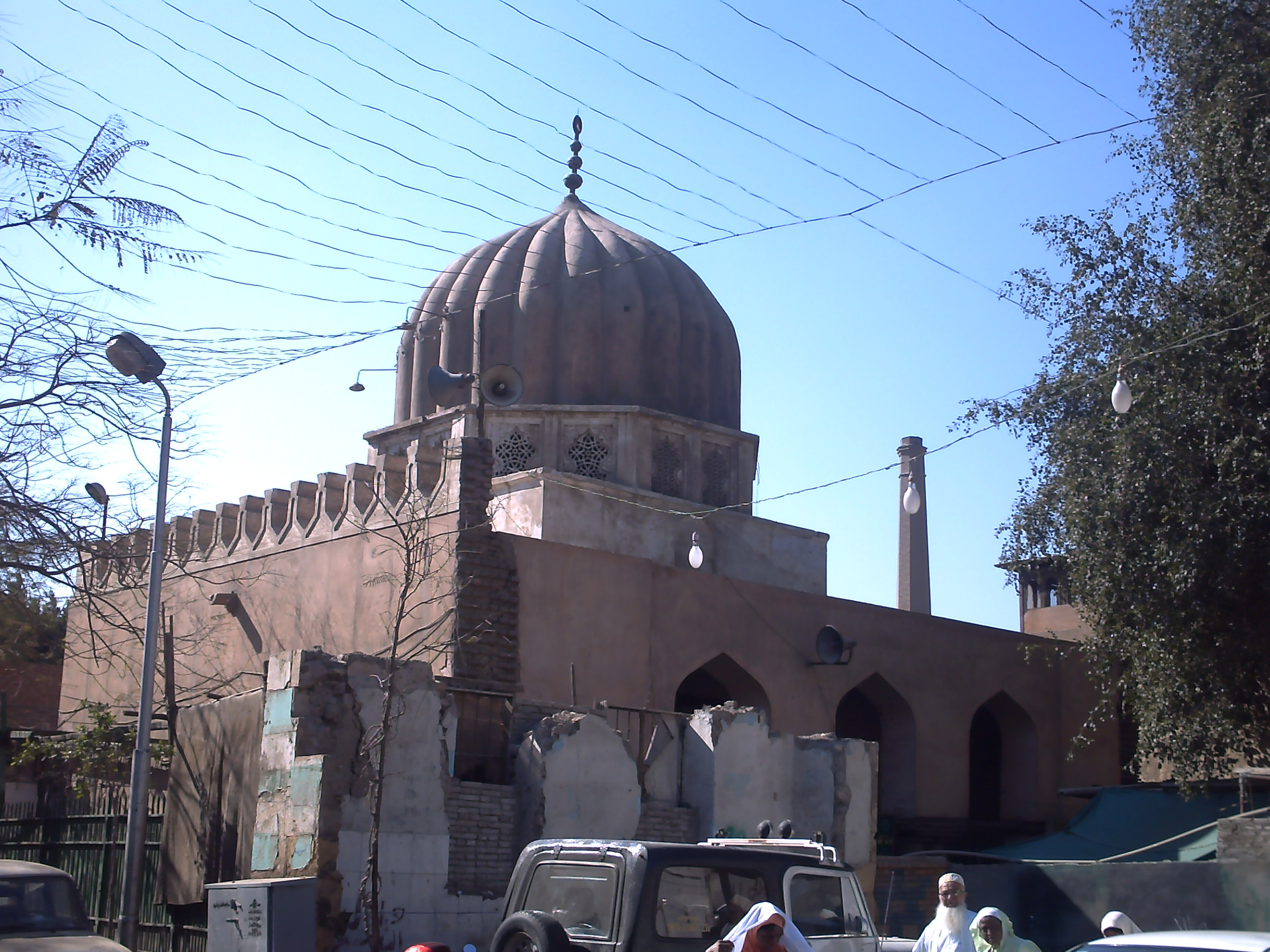
Mashhad of Sayyida Ruqayya in Cairo

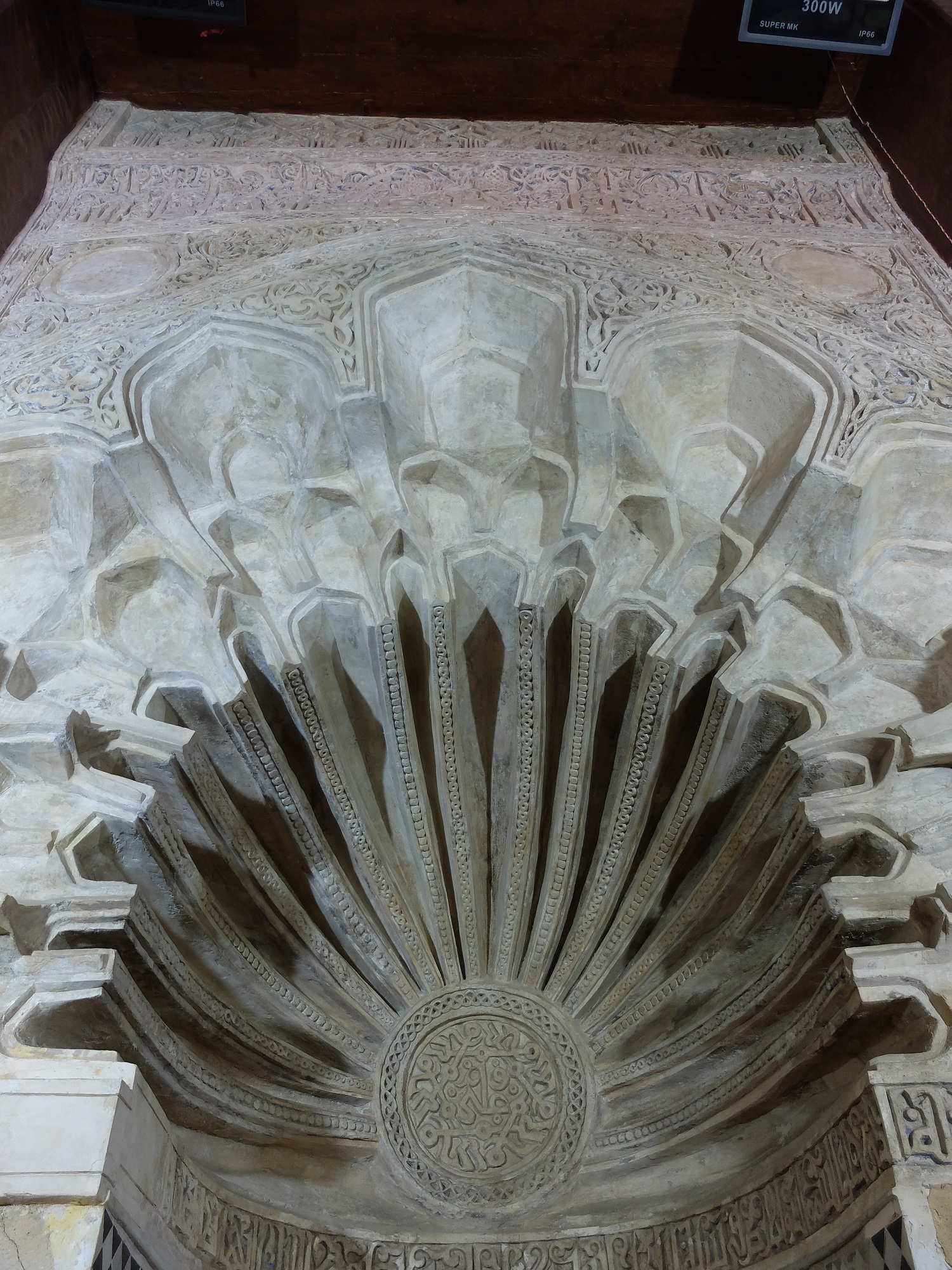
Mihrab in the Mashhad of Sayyida Ruqayya

Two other important mashads from the Fatimid era in Cairo are those of Sayyida Ruqayya and Yayha al-Shabih, in the Southern Cemetery. Sayyida Ruqayya, a daughter of Ali, never visited Egypt, but the mashhad was built in 1033 to commemorate her. It is similar to al-Juyushi's, but with a larger, fluted dome. The building today includes only a domed chamber preceded by a portico, but it was probably originally preceded by a courtyard. Its most remarkable feature is its elegantly decorated mihrab of carved stucco, which scholar Doris Behrens-Abouseif describes as "one of the great masterpieces of stucco in Egypt". The mihrab niche is shaped like a keel arch and has fluted ridges radiating from a central epigraphic medallion in the middle of its conch, a design which may have been inspired by the decorative niches of the façade of the al-Aqmar Mosque.

== Fortifications ==
=== Fortifications of Mahdia ===
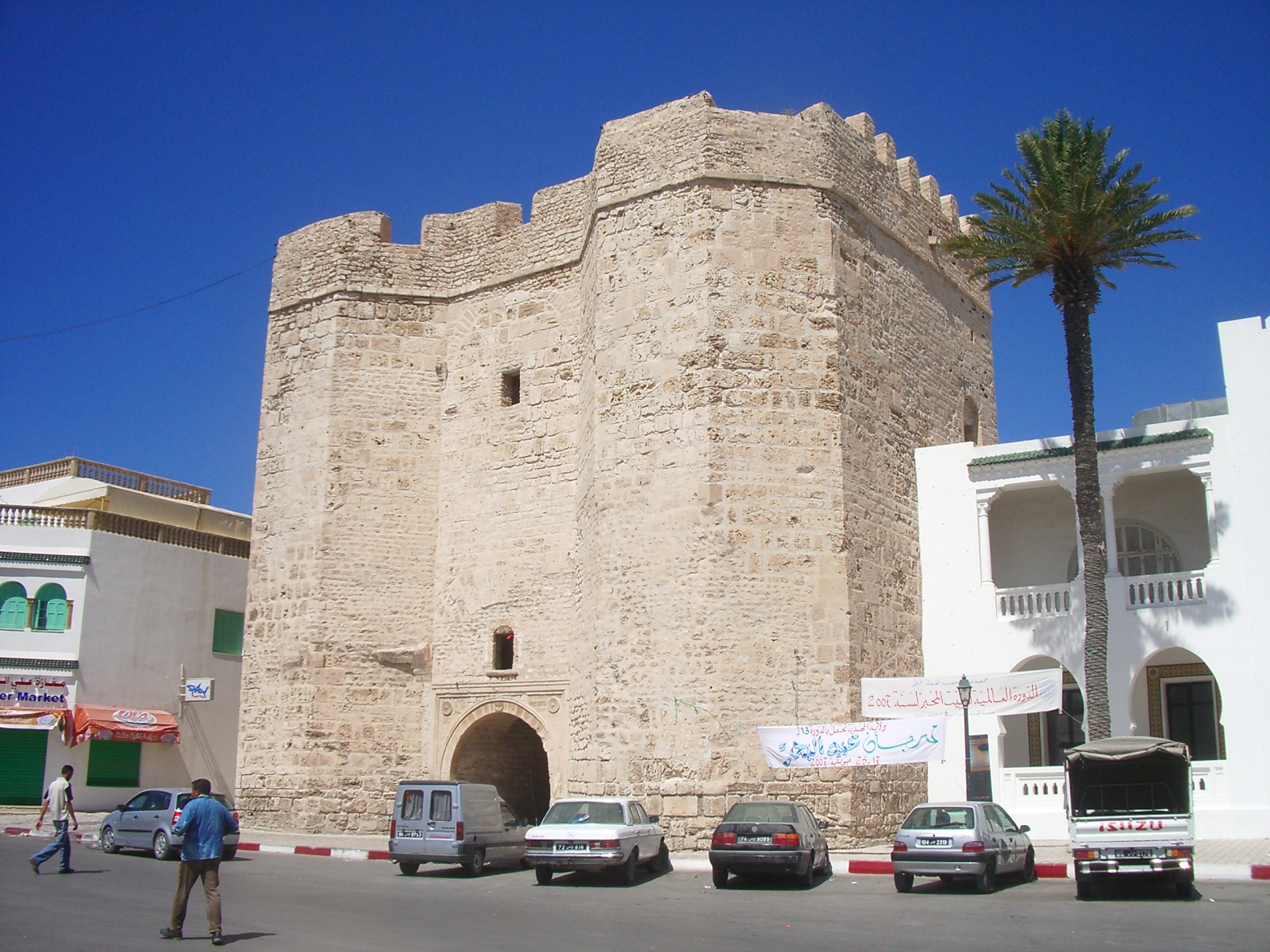
Skifa al-Kahla, the Fatimid gate of Mahdia, Tunisia

After the Aghlabids came the Fatimids, who took over Ifriqiya in the early 10th century. Most notably, the Fatimids built a heavily-fortified new capital at Mahdia, located on a narrow peninsula extending from the coastline into the sea. The narrow land approach to the peninsula was protected by an extremely thick stone wall reinforced with square bastions and a round polygonal tower at either end where the wall met the sea. The only gate was the Skifa al-Kahla (Arabic: السقيفة الكحلة, romanized: al-saqifa al-kaḥla, lit. 'the dark vestibule'), defended by two flanking bastions and featuring a vaulted interior passage 44 meters long. (Although it's not clear today how much of the structure dates from the original Fatimid construction.) The peninsula's shoreline was also defended by a stone wall with towers at regular intervals, interrupted only by the entrance to a man-made harbor and arsenal.

=== Fortifications of Cairo ===
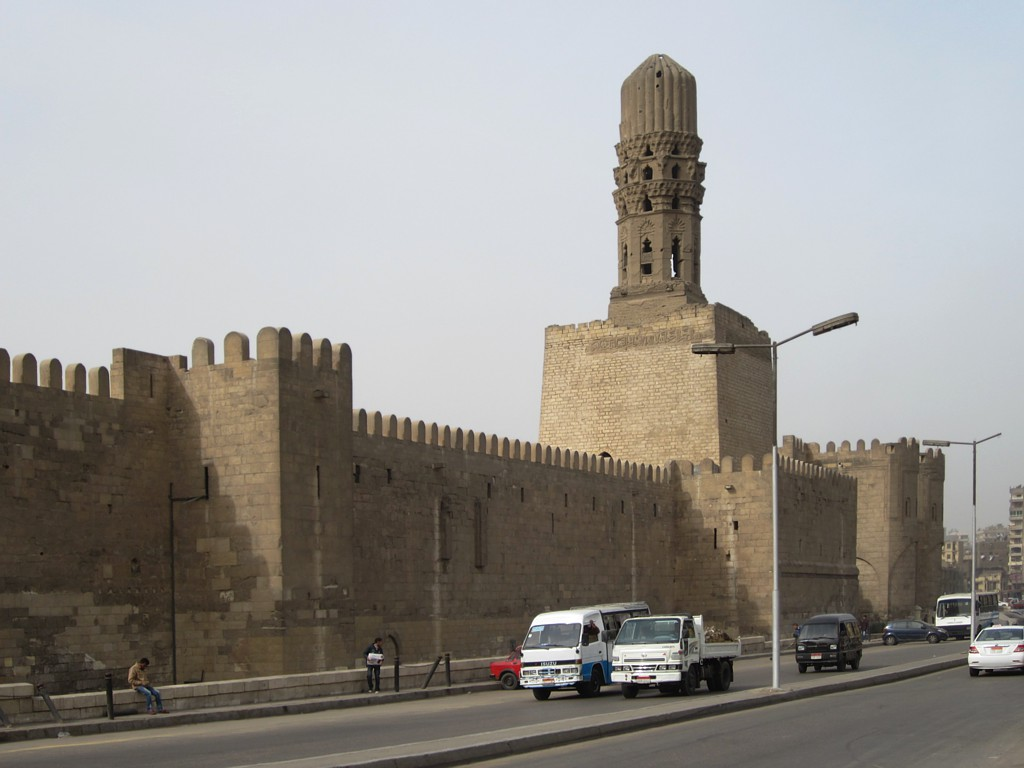
Walls between the Bab al-Nasr and Bab al-Futuh gates in Cairo. The gates and walls were rebuilt in stone by Badr al-Jamali in 1087.

A new city wall was built around Cairo on the orders of the vizier Badr al-Jamali (r. 1074–1094). Cairo had expanded beyond the original city walls, and the city faced threats from the east, notably by the Turkoman Atsiz ibn Uvaq, commander of the Seljuk army. In fact, the fortifications were never put to the test. Three of the gates in the new walls have survived: Bab al-Nasr (1087), Bab al-Futuh (1087) and Bab Zuweila (1092). Bab al-Futuh and Bab Zuweila were built at the northern and southern ends of al-Mu'izz Street, the main axis of Fatimid Cairo.

Al-Jamali, an Armenian in origin, is said to have employed Armenians from the north of Mesopotamia as well as Syrians in his extensive building works. Each gate was said to have been built by a different architect. The gates have Byzantine architectural features, with little trace of the Islamic tradition. According to Maqrīzī, the gates were built by three Christian monks from Edessa, who had fled from the Seljuks. There are no surviving structures similar to the gates near Edessa or in Armenia, but stylistic evidence indicates that Byzantine origins for the design are plausible.

Al-Jamali preferred stone as the medium for his building works, introducing a new style into Cairo architecture. All three gates have massive towers linked by curtain walls above the passageways. They introduced architectural features new to Egypt including the pendentives that support the domes above the passageways of the Bab al-Futuh and Bab Zuweila gates, and intersecting barrel vaults. Use of semi-circular and horizontal arches, and lack of pointed arches, represented a departure from normal Fatimid architecture, probably taken from Syrian examples, and were never widely used during the Fatimid period. The use of stone also reflects Syrian tastes.

The passageways through each of the gates are 20 metres (66 ft) long, and have vaulted ceilings with hidden machicolation openings in their ceilings. The lower part of each tower is of solid stone, while the upper third has a vaulted room with arrowslits. An unusual feature of the wall near Bab al-Nasr is a stone latrine which appears like a balcony. The wall between Bab al-Nasr and Bab al-Futuh contains an inscription of Quranic texts in Kufic characters.

==== Bab al-Futuh ====
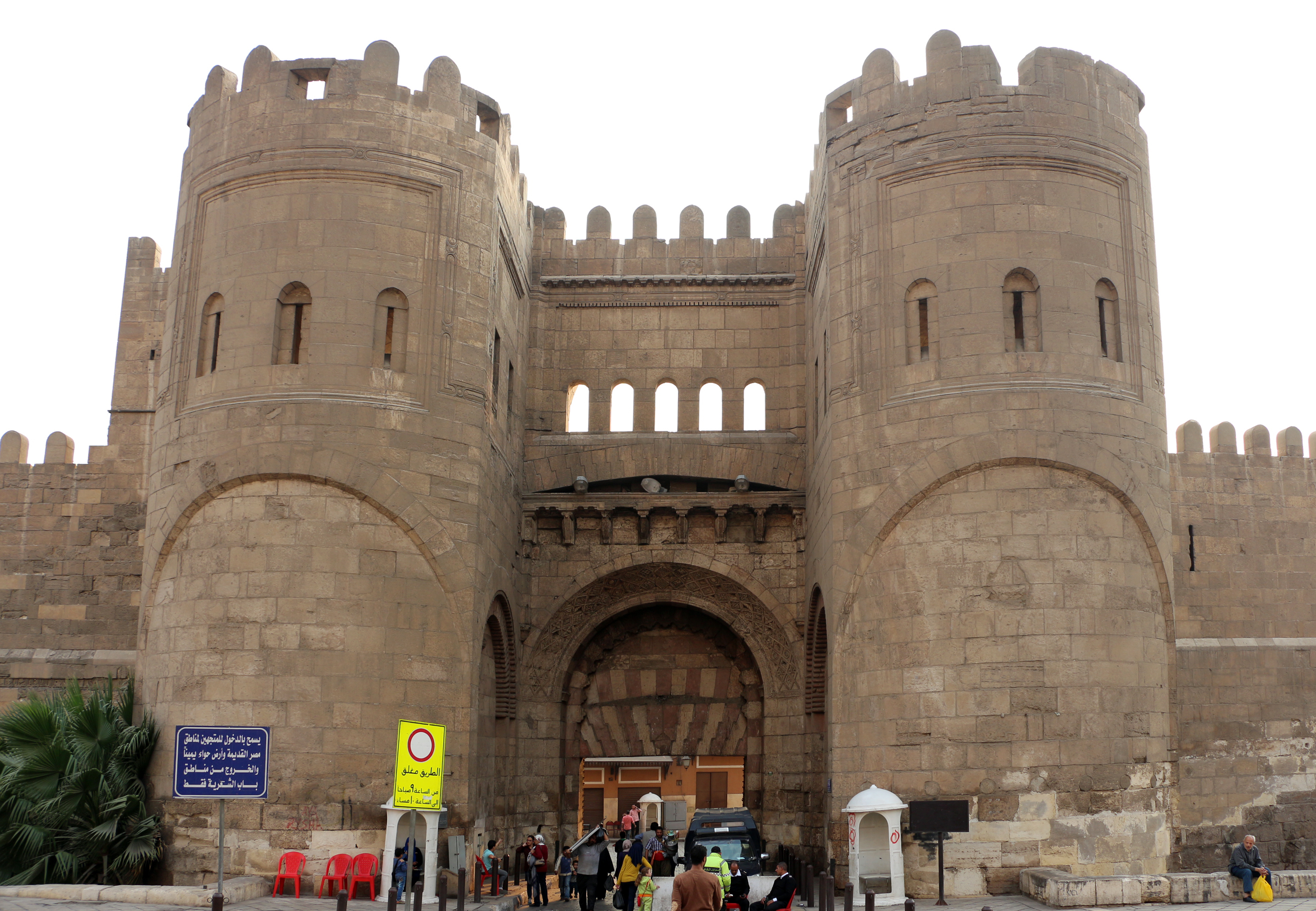
Bab al-Futuh in Cairo

Bab al-Futuh is a gate in the north wall of the old city, built in 1087. It stands at the northern end of al-Mu'izz Street. The name "Futuh" means "conquest". the gate had rounded towers, with both of their façades incorporating a design of two parallel carved lines with loops between them. No earlier use of this decorative style is known, although it became common in the Mamluk period. There are carved brackets above the entrance arch, two of which have the head of a ram. This appears to be a survival of pre-Islamic symbolism. However, Fatimid arabesques decorate the brackets.

==== Bab al-Nasr ====
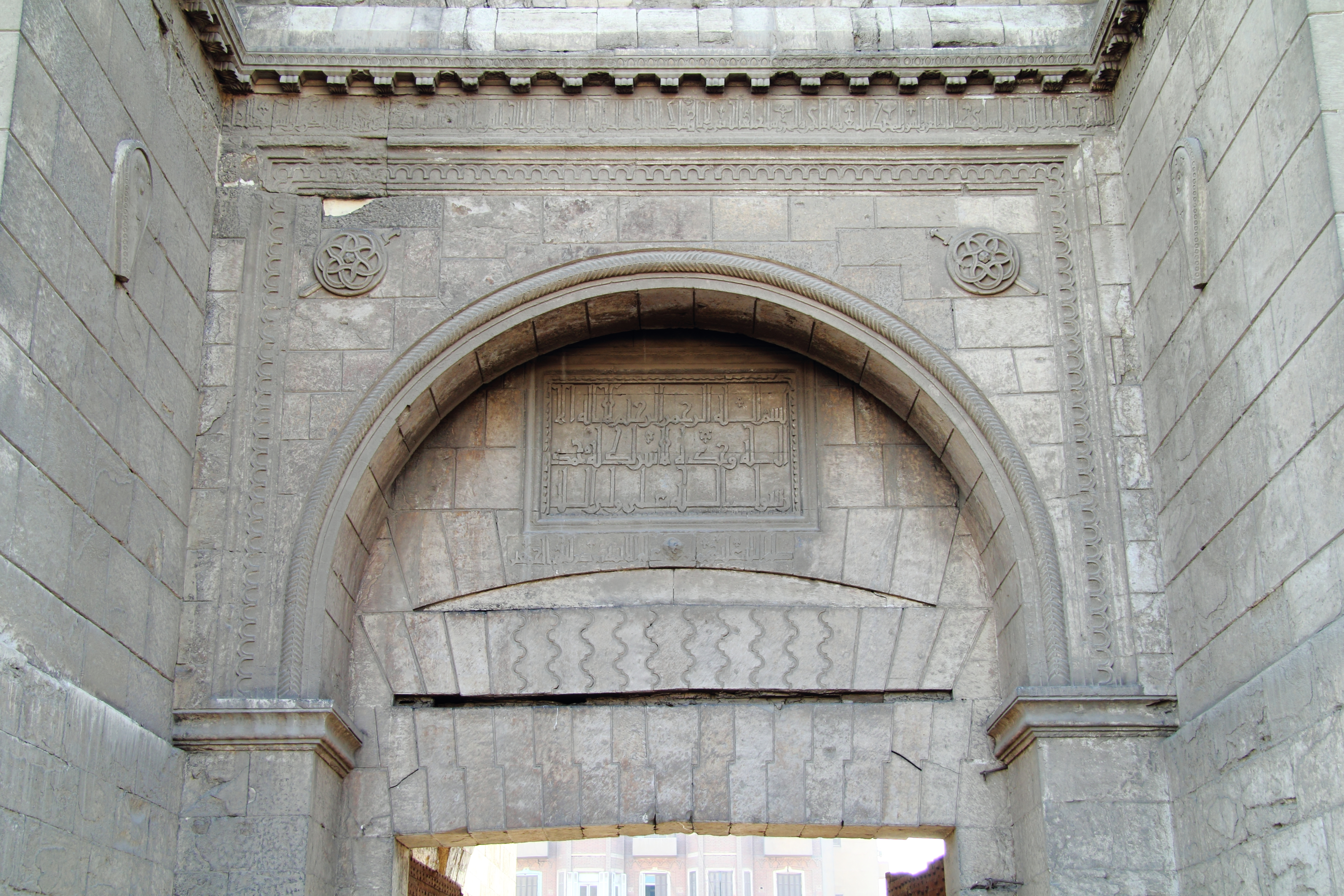
Fatimid inscription and stone-carved details on Bab al-Nasr, Cairo

Bab al-Nasr is a massive fortified gate built in 1087 with rectangular stone towers. The name means "Gate of Victory". The entrance vestibule is cross-vaulted. There are two shallow domes over the upper levels of the towers. The walls are decorated with shields and swords, possibly Byzantine in design. Many French inscriptions on Bab al-Nasr indicate use of the fort by Napoleon's soldiers, including "Tour Courbin" and "Tour Julien".

==== Bab Zuwayla ====
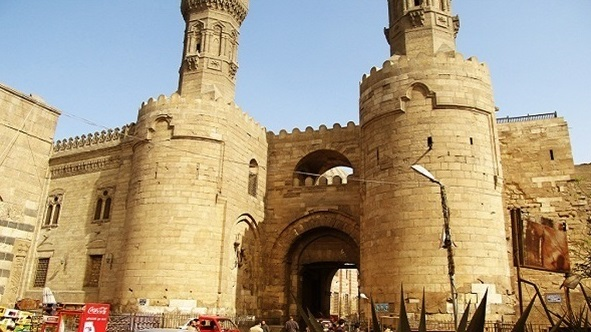
Bab Zuwayla in Cairo, with two Mamluk minarets added

Bab Zuwayla (or Zuweila) was built in 1092 and is the last remaining southern gate from the walls of Fatimid Cairo. Its name comes from bab, meaning "door", and Zuwayla, the name of Berber tribe whose soldiers were housed here after the foundation of Cairo. The towers are semi-circular. Their inner flanks have lobed arches as decorations, a North African motif introduced to Egypt by the Fatimids. The vestibule to the right contains a half-domed recess with elegantly carved arches at each corner. The massive wooden doors of the gate weigh about three and a half tons each. The gate today is topped by two minarets which were added in the 15th-century during the Mamluk period. (Note: The Mosque of Sultan al-Muayyad, completed in 1420, was built beside the Bab Zuweila gate by Sultan al-Muyyad. He destroyed part of the city wall to make room, and placed the minarets on top of the gate rather than the mosque.)

== Restorations and modern mosques ==
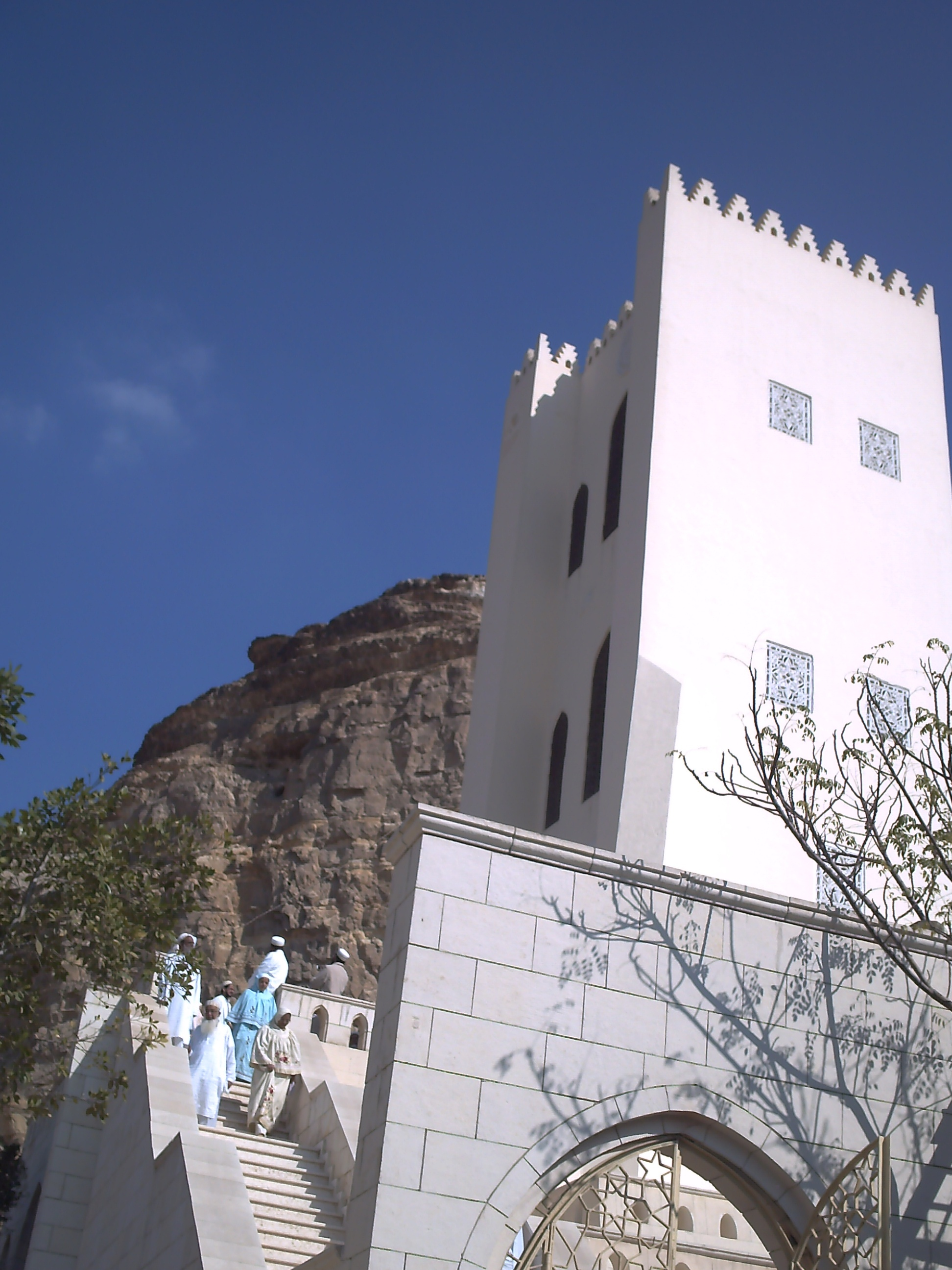
Lulua Mosque, completely rebuilt by the Dawoodi Bohra and refurbished in 1998

The Fatimid buildings have gone through many renovations and restructurings in different styles from the early Mamluk period to modern times.

The Fakahani Mosque exemplifies this process. It was built in the Fatimid period, either as a suspended mosque (one with shops underneath it) or with a high basement. After the earthquake of 1302 it was rebuilt. In 1440 an ablution basin was added, and early in the Ottoman period a minaret was built. The amir Ahmad Katkhuda Mustahfazan al-Kharbutli in 1735 ordered a major reconstruction, almost all of the original building being replaced apart from two doors. These finely carved doors were registered as a historical monument in 1908 by the committee of conservation, and the building itself was registered in 1937.

The Dawoodi Bohra, a group of around one million Tayyibi Ismaili Shi'ites who trace their faith back to converts from the Hindu faith during the time of the Fatimid caliph al-Mustansir Billah (1029–1094), have been engaged in restorations of the Cairo mosques since the 1970s. Aside from respecting their heritage, the purpose of the campaign to restore Fatimid architecture in Cairo is to encourage ziyaret, a pilgrimage which aims to increase the cohesion of the Bohra community internationally. These activities have drawn negative comments from critics in Europe and America who believe that the mosques should be preserved in their current state.

In November 1979 the first newsletter of the Society for the Preservation of the Architectural Resources of Egypt wrote a scathing report of the Bohras' renovation of the al-Hakim mosque, saying "Though their method of financing the project is intriguing, their concrete arcades can only be deplored." However, when the mosque was re-opened a year later the Egyptian Gazette was complimentary about the transformation of the run-down building, achieved without resort to public aid.

The restorations have significantly changed the buildings from their prior state. Helwan marble has been used extensively on both interior and exterior surfaces, and inscriptions in the interior have been gilded. Motifs and designs have been copied from one mosque to another. The qibla bay of the al-Hakim mosque, which had been irreparably damaged, was replaced by a version in marble and gilt of the mihrab of al-Azhar mosque. The Lu'lu'a Mosque, formerly a ruin, has been rebuilt as a three-story building somewhat like Bab al-Nasr, with decorative elements from al-Aqmar and al-Hakim. Silver and gold grilles now enclose tombs in mosques and mausoleums. Arches, particularly in groups of three, are considered "Fatimid", regardless of their shape. The result is what could be termed "Neo-Fatimid" architecture, now found in new Bohra mosques around the world. The Aga Khan III, leader of the Nizari Isma'ili sect, was buried in 1957 in a mausoleum built in this neo-Fatimid style. In some cases this style incorporates elements that are clearly from a different period. All but one of the Fatimid minarets were destroyed by an earthquake in 1303, and later rebuilt by the Mamluks, but replicas of these minarets are used in Neo-Fatimid mosques.

== See also ==
- List of architectural styles
- Fatimid art
