= Funerary complex of Sultan Barquq =

Historic late medieval Mosque and Madrasa in Egypt

- مجموعة الظاهر برقوق
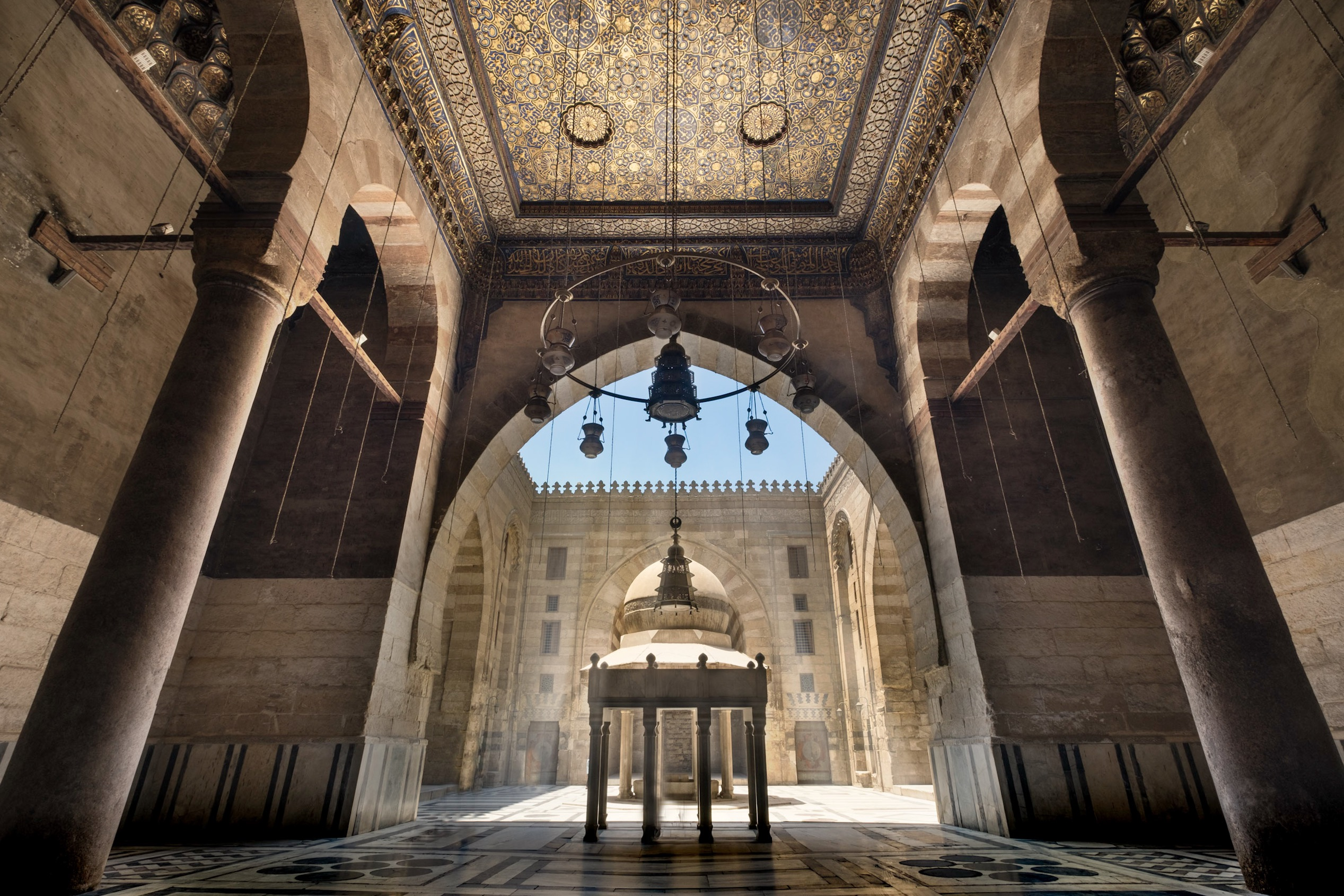
- Interior with courtyard and four iwans

Religion
- Affiliation: Islam
- Ecclesiastical or organisational status: Mosque; Madrasa; Khanqah; Mausoleum
- Status: Active

Location
- Location: Al-Mu'izz Street, Cairo
- Country: Egypt
- Interactive map of Funerary complex of Sultan Barquq
- Coordinates: 30°03′1″N 31°15′41″E

Architecture
- Architect: Ahmad al-Tuluni
- Type: Mosque, madrasa, khanqah, mausoleum
- Style: Mamluk
- Founder: al-Zahir Barquq
- Groundbreaking: 1384
- Completed: 1386

Specifications
- Dome: 1
- Minaret: 1
- Materials: Timber, stone, marble, lead, bricks

The Funerary complex of Sultan Barquq (Note: Also referred to as theMadrasa–Khanqah of Sultan Barquq, or Complex of Barquq, among other variations.) (Arabic: مجموعة الظاهر برقوق) is an Islamic religious complex in the historic district of Cairo, Egypt. The complex was commissioned by Sultan al-Zahir Barquq, the first sultan of the Burji line of Mamluk sultans. Its construction took place between 1384 and 1386.

The complex was designed as a mosque, a madrasa (college for religious education) teaching the four Islamic schools of thought, and as a khanqah (hospice for Sufis). Also attached to it is a domed mausoleum chamber which was intended to house the remains of the sultan, though Barquq was ultimately buried in another funerary complex. Along with the complex of Sultan Qalawun and the Madrasa of al-Nasir Muhammad, with which it is contiguous, the complex forms one of the greatest arrangements of Mamluk monumental architecture in Cairo, in a section of the historic al-Mu'izz street known as Bayn al-Qasrayn.

== History ==
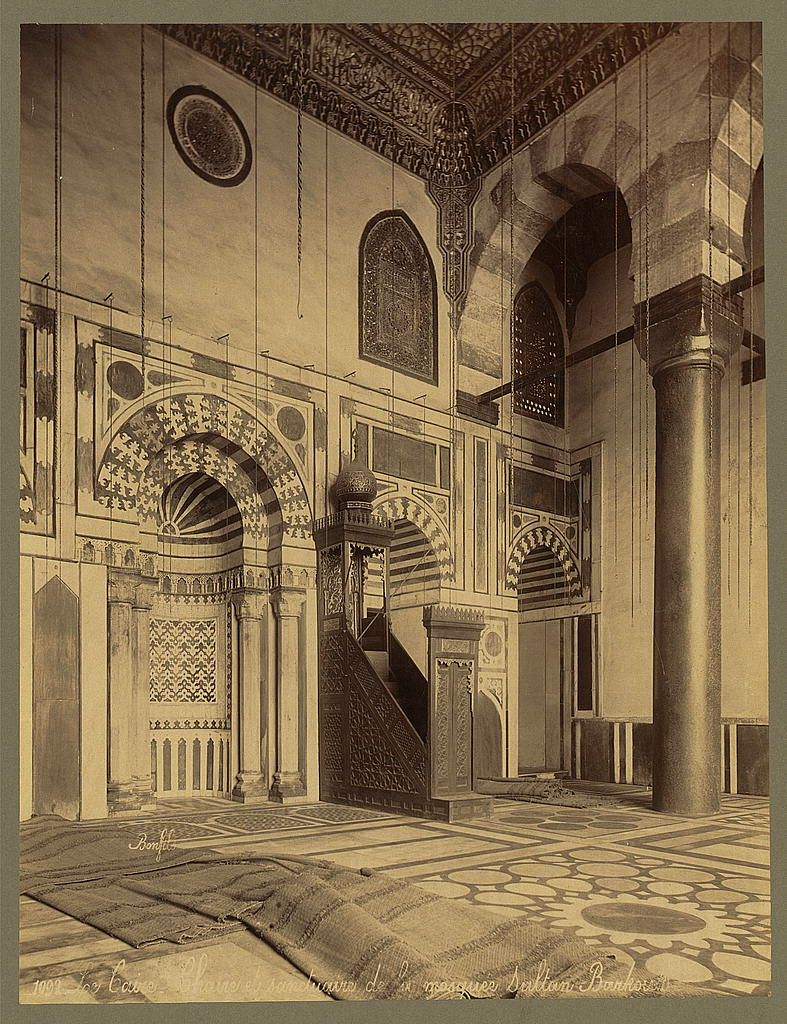
Interior of the prayer area in 1867

Al-Zahir Barquq was the first Burji Mamluk sultan of Cairo. He was a Circassian slave purchased by Yalbugha al-Umari, a mamluk emir who ruled Cairo on behalf of Sultan Sha'ban. Like many other mamluks of the time, he was trained in the Circassian military barracks located in the citadel. Under Yalbugha, Barquq gained considerable influence in the state, and he subsequently became a key player in the period of chaos and internal conflict following the violent deaths of first Yalbugha and then Sultan Sha'ban. Eventually, Barquq gained enough support to depose Sultan Hajj, a son of Sha'ban who was still a child, and take the throne for himself in 1382. Following his ascension, he mainly recruited Mamluks of Circassian origin to his regime, and it was this group which dominated the Sultanate until its eventual fall to the Ottomans. Since they lived and trained mostly in Cairo's Citadel, they were referred to as the "Burji" Mamluks, meaning Mamluks "of the tower".

Despite the regime change, Barquq's construction shows architectural and artistic continuity with preceding Mamluk buildings. His complex shows important similarities in form and layout with the earlier and much larger religious complex of Sultan Hassan, though the components have been shifted around to suit the different setting. Barquq built his complex in one of Cairo's most prestigious locations, Bayn al-Qasrayn, named after the previous Fatimid royal palaces which occupied the site (and which were progressively replaced by religious buildings and mausoleums of Ayyubid and Mamluk sultans). His building is right next to the Madrasa of Al-Nasir Muhammad and the funerary complex of Sultan Qalawun (both important Mamluk sultans of the past), forming a long continuous line of imposing religious complexes along this street in the heart of Cairo.

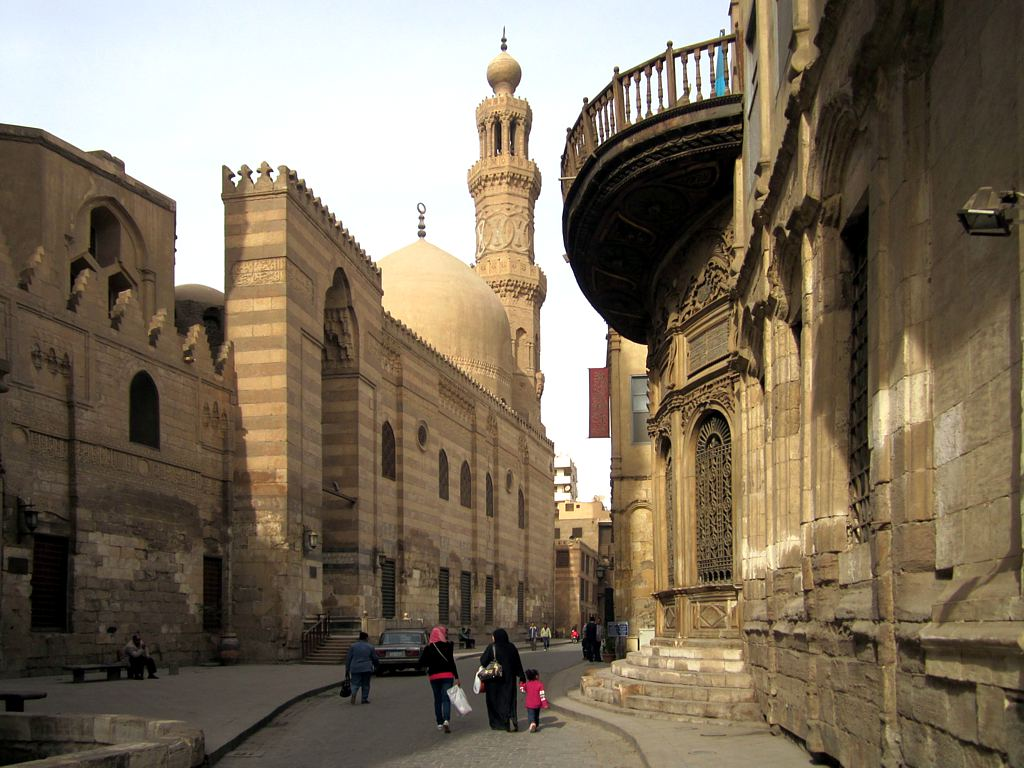
View of Barquq's complex in the environment of al-Mu'izz street.

Furthermore, being part of Bayn al-Qasrayn (along al-Mu'izz street), the mosque is embedded in the fabric of Egyptian society and the daily life of Egyptian citizens. One of its lesser known purposes is as a shelter for evicted families in the 1970s. The street the mosque is located on has inspired many works of art and literature most famously the novel "Bayn al-Qasrayn" or palace walk by Naguib Mahfouz. The film which was inspired by the novel, also includes many images of the mosque in its background.

== Construction ==
Construction of Barquq's madrasa and funerary complex began in December 1384 (Rajab 786 in the Islamic calendar) and was finished, according to the inscription on its facade, in April 1386 (Rabi' I 788). Since the site was in the busy heart of Cairo, some existing structures, including a khan or caravanserai, had to be demolished before construction. Although Mamluk monuments were often built with the help of forced labour (with either prisoners of war or by corvée), Barquq's construction was reported to have used only paid workers.

Barquq appointed his emir Jarkas al-Khalili as supervisor of the works, while the architect or master builder (titled as mu'allim in Arabic) was Ahmad al-Tuluni. Ahmad al-Tuluni, from a family of carpenters and stone-cutters, was notable as one of the few master builders of this period to reach great success and recognition, with Barquq marrying two of his female relatives. He had enough means to eventually build a mausoleum for himself in Cairo's Southern Cemetery. Jarkas al-Khalili, the sultan's master of the stables, was also notable for building the original Khan al-Khalili, which gave its name to the famous bazaar still there today in Cairo.

== Architecture ==
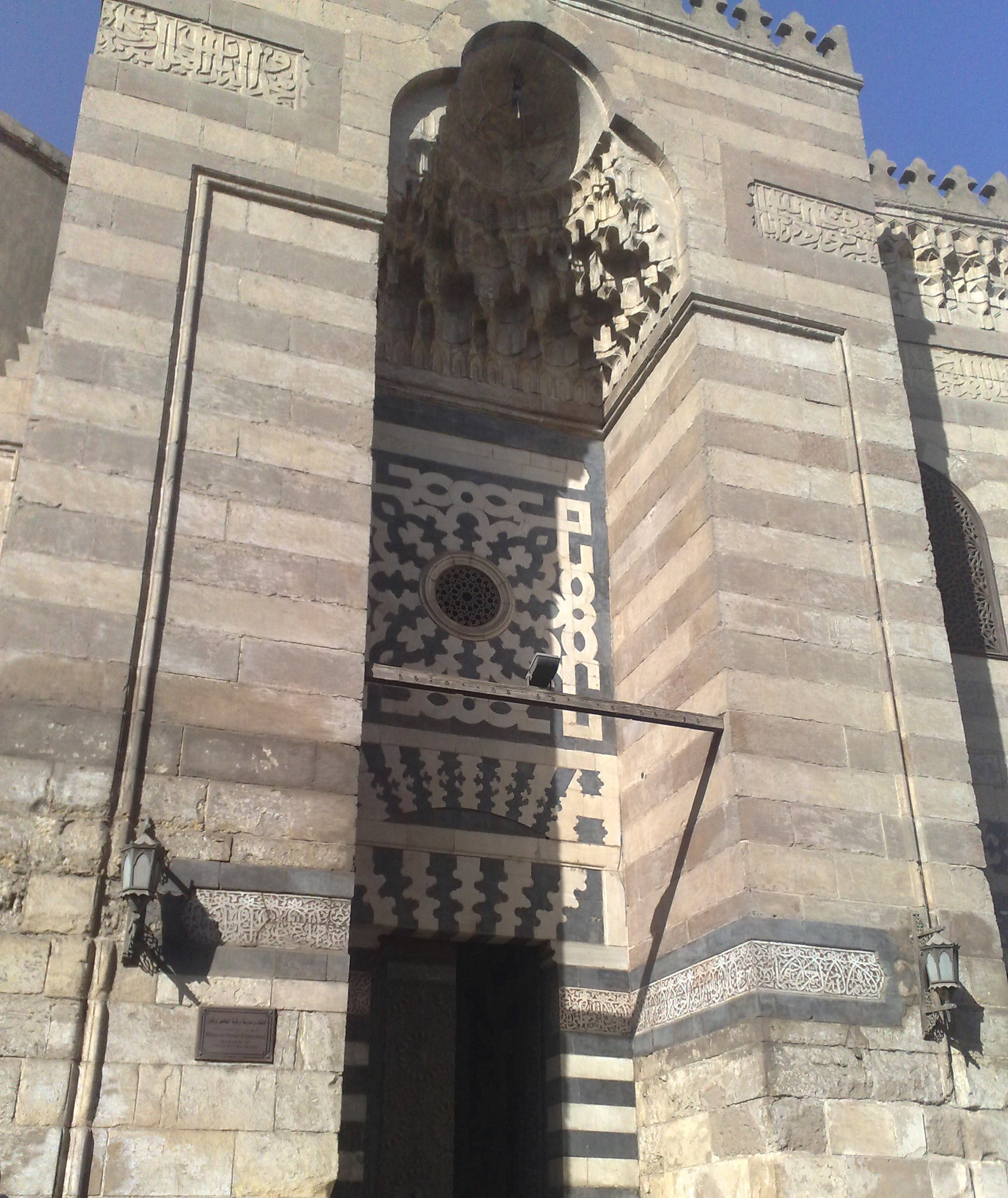
Entrance portal.

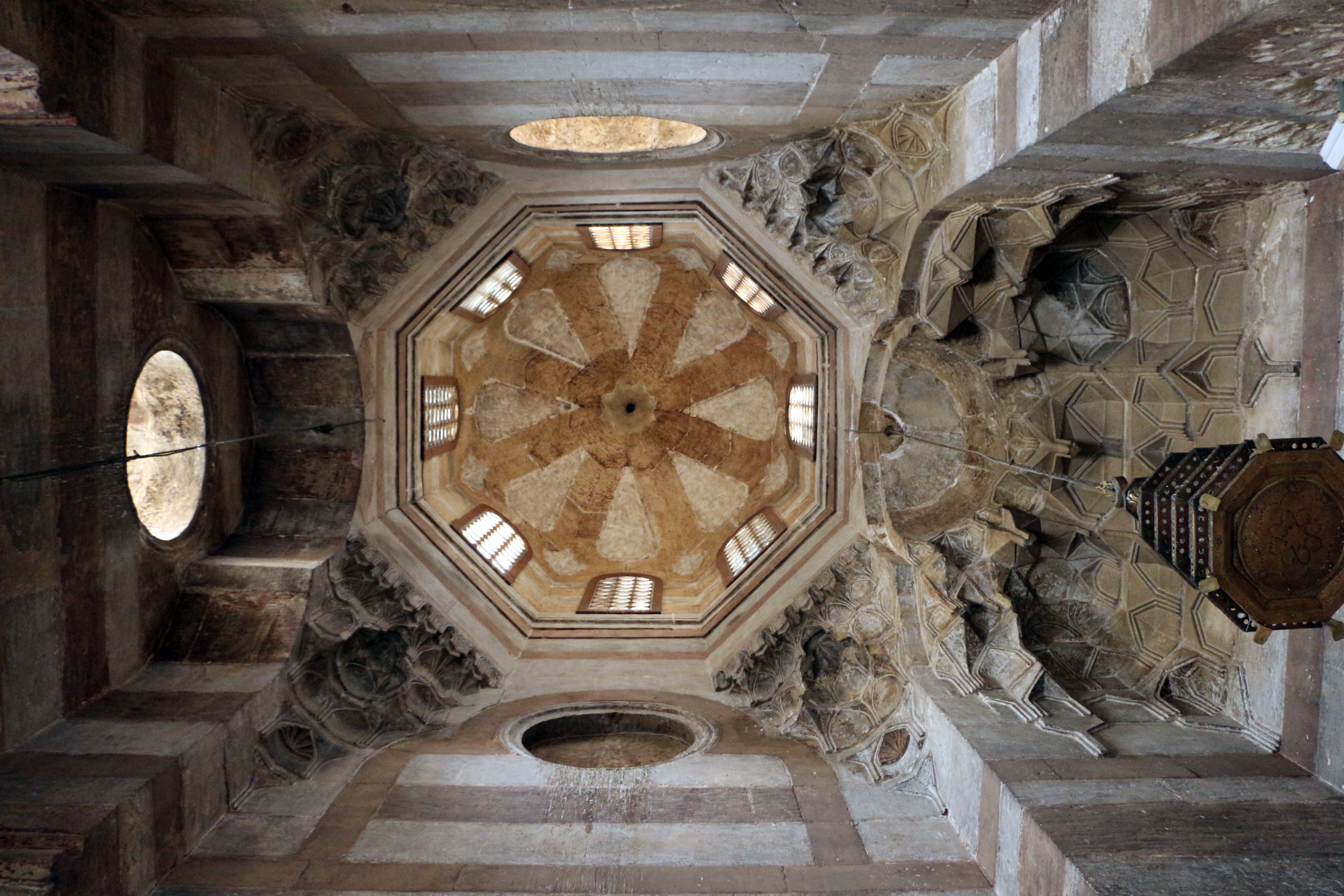
The lantern and vaults over the vestibule.

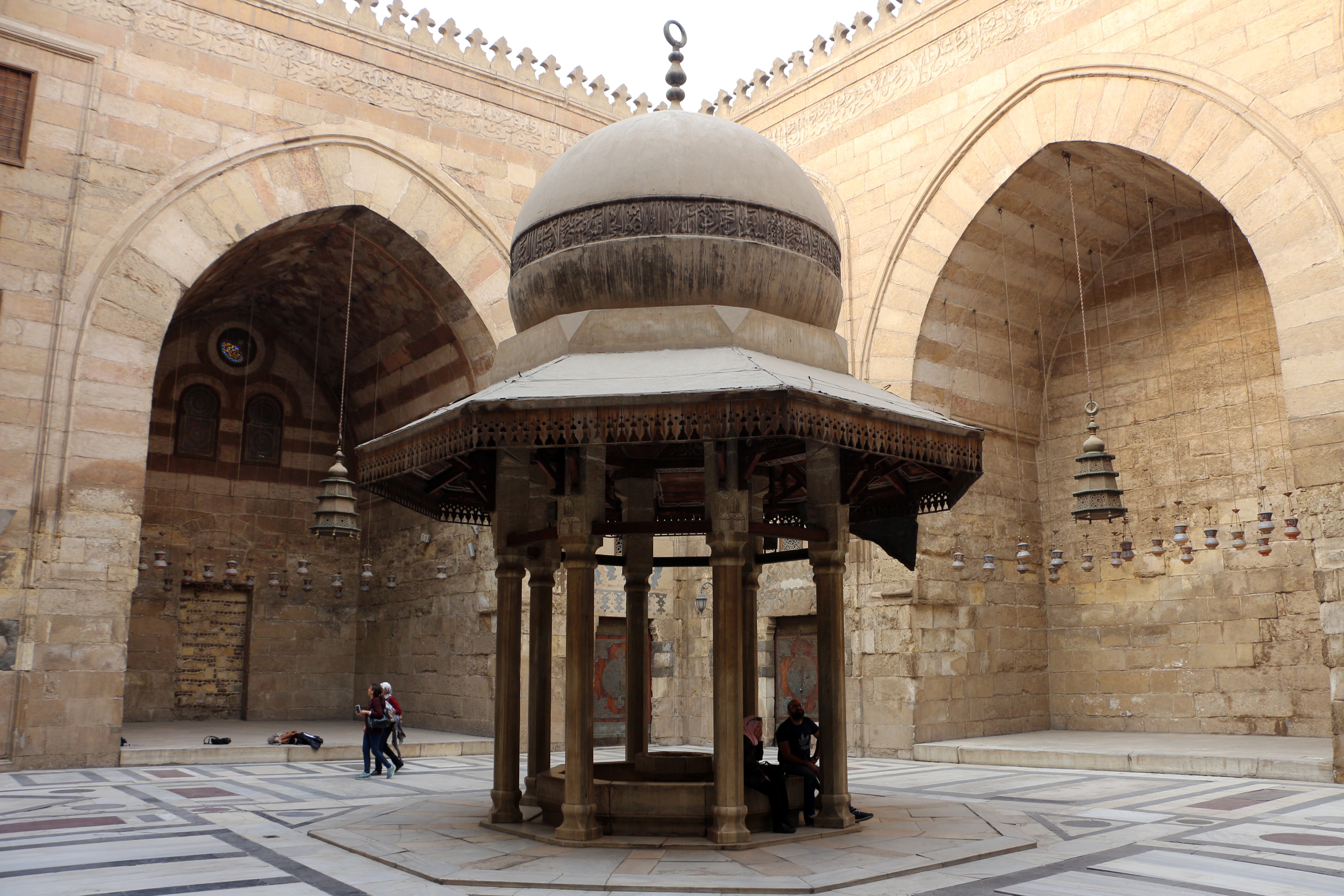
The courtyard (sahn) and sabil.

Like most Mamluk foundations, Barquq's religious complex served several functions at a time. The foundation deed states that the complex included a Friday mosque, a madrasa that taught the four Sunni madhhabs for 125 students, and a khanqah for sixty Sufis. The overall design and decoration resemble that of the larger and earlier Mosque-Madrasa of Sultan Hassan. The building also included a mausoleum whose dome is visible from the street. Barquq had the remains of his father moved and buried in the mausoleum of his complex when it was completed. Barquq himself, however, later wished to be buried in a new mausoleum in the Northern Cemetery of Cairo, a task completed by his son Faraj.

Zakat Khanm a mansion at the same location, supervised the construction by Emir Jarkas Al Khalili, the prince of Akhor.

=== Exterior ===
The exterior facade of the complex appears to have been carefully designed to maximize its prominence along a street which already features other major monuments: the minaret is at the far northern corner and is superimposed visually with the dome (a common arrangement), while at the southern corner the entrance portal projects both horizontally and vertically from the surrounding facades (a feature known as a pishtaq). A foundation inscription runs along the upper part of the wall, just below a row of muqarnas sculpting, while another Qur'anic inscription can be found at a lower level around the doorway. The Qur'anic inscription features an ornate and unusual calligraphic style by which the top lines of letters join together into flower-like knots. The two round windows visible along the exterior wall correspond to the mihrabs of the madrasa and the mausoleum.

The entrance portal rises up to an ornamental stone vault with muqarnas carving. Below this is a large panel of inlaid marble, similar to an example found in the Sultan Hassan madrasa's vestibule and possibly brought from Syria. The bronze doors of the entrance are finely decorated with geometric patterns based on 18-pointed and 12-pointed stars, and feature another inscription.

=== Interior ===
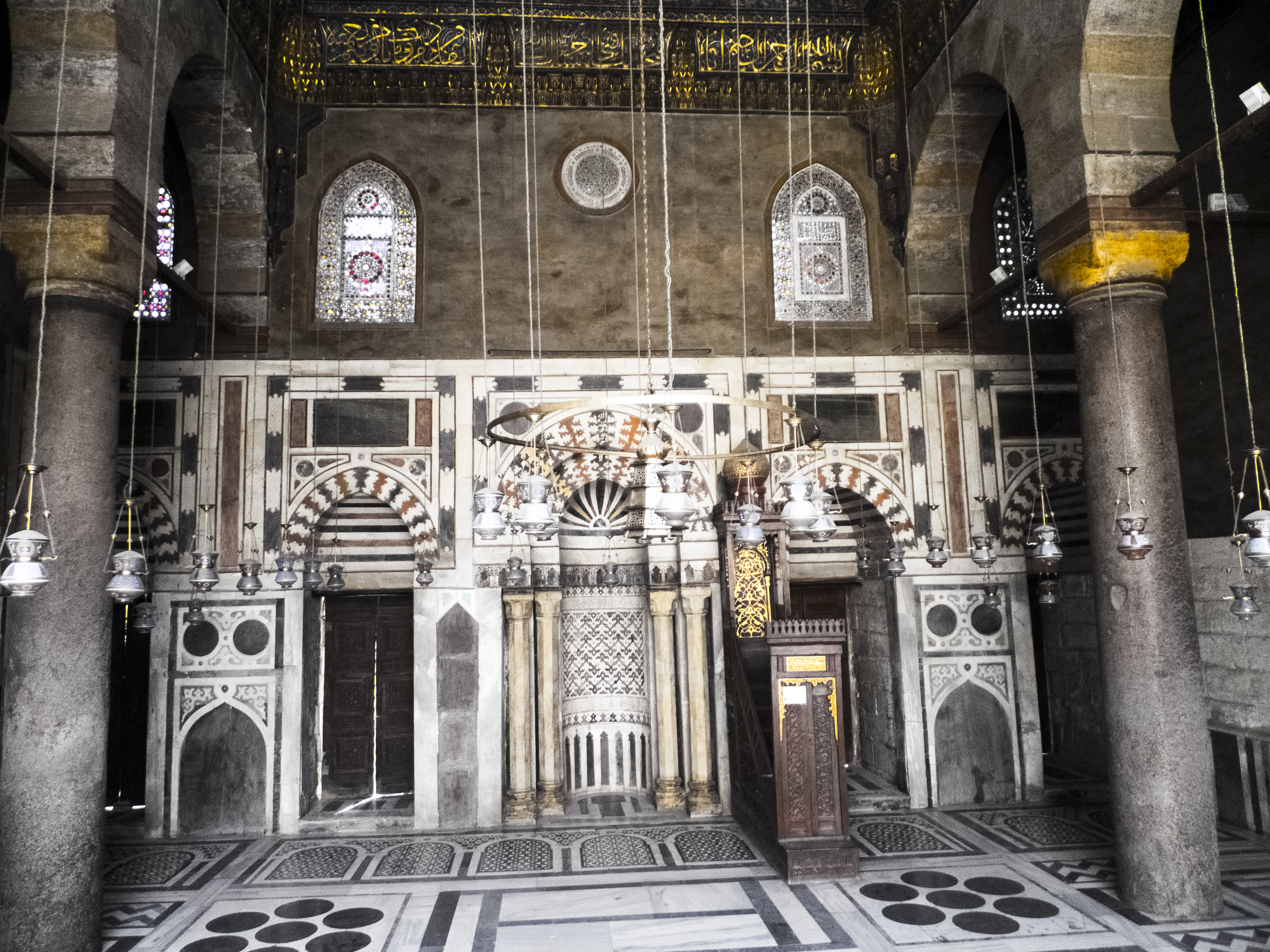
Qibla wall with mihrab in the middle

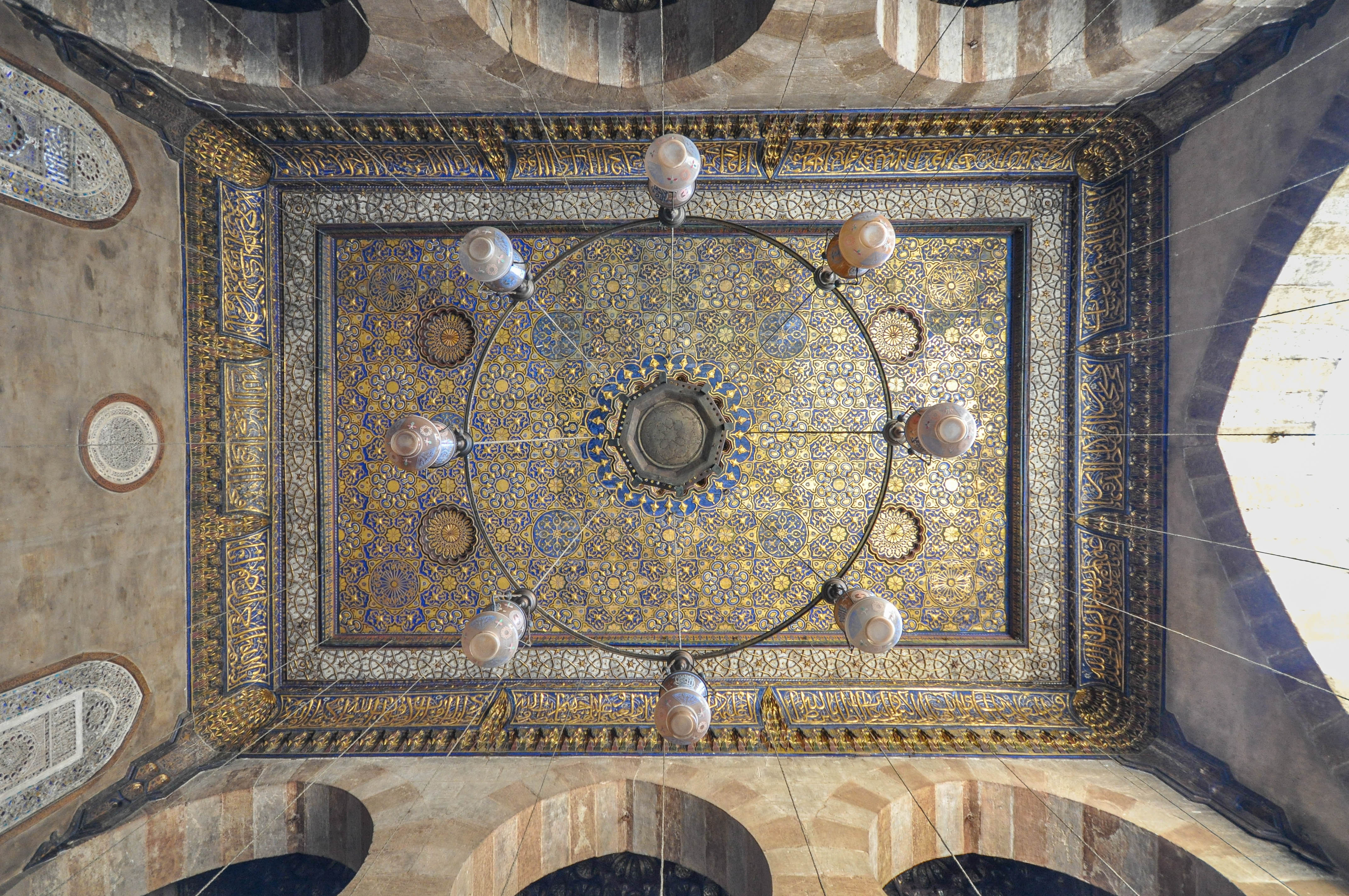
The exceptional gilt wooden ceiling of the sanctuary iwan

The entrance vestibule, much like the one at Sultan Hassan's madrasa, is topped by a lantern structure above and more muqarnas vaults. From here, a passage leads to the central rectangular courtyard (a sahn) flanked by four iwans (vaulted rooms open on one side), which was characteristic of monumental madrasas of the period. The walls are enlivened by alternating colored stone (known as ablaq). The sabil (a fountain or pavilion for water) in the middle of the courtyard is a recent addition by the late 19th-century "Comité" overseeing its restoration, though some kind of fountain was still there originally. The iwan on the eastern side (towards the direction of prayer) is covered by the largest single wooden roof in Mamluk architecture and shelters the main sanctuary or prayer hall of the complex, while the other three iwans are covered by stone vaults. The main prayer hall has a basilica-style plan similar to that found in the madrasa of Qalawun's complex, with columns upholding the roof. However, its richly painted and carved wooden ceiling is innovative and is considered and outstanding feature of this monument, with patterns resembling those in contemporary illumination of Qur'ans. Both the floor and the qibla wall (the wall marking the direction of prayer) are adorned with marble mosaics and paneling. A rare and unusual detail are the mihrab-shaped marble mosaics lining the floor at the foot of the qibla wall. The main mihrab itself is covered in multicolored marble mosaics and flanked by four decorative columns (once again, similar to the mihrab of the Sultan Hassan madrasa).

The windows around the complex feature the usual stucco frames with colored glass, though the roundels above the mihrabs have wooden frames. At the back of the building (on the western side) were most of the cells and rooms for the resident students and Sufis, but today this section is in ruins.

==== Mausoleum ====
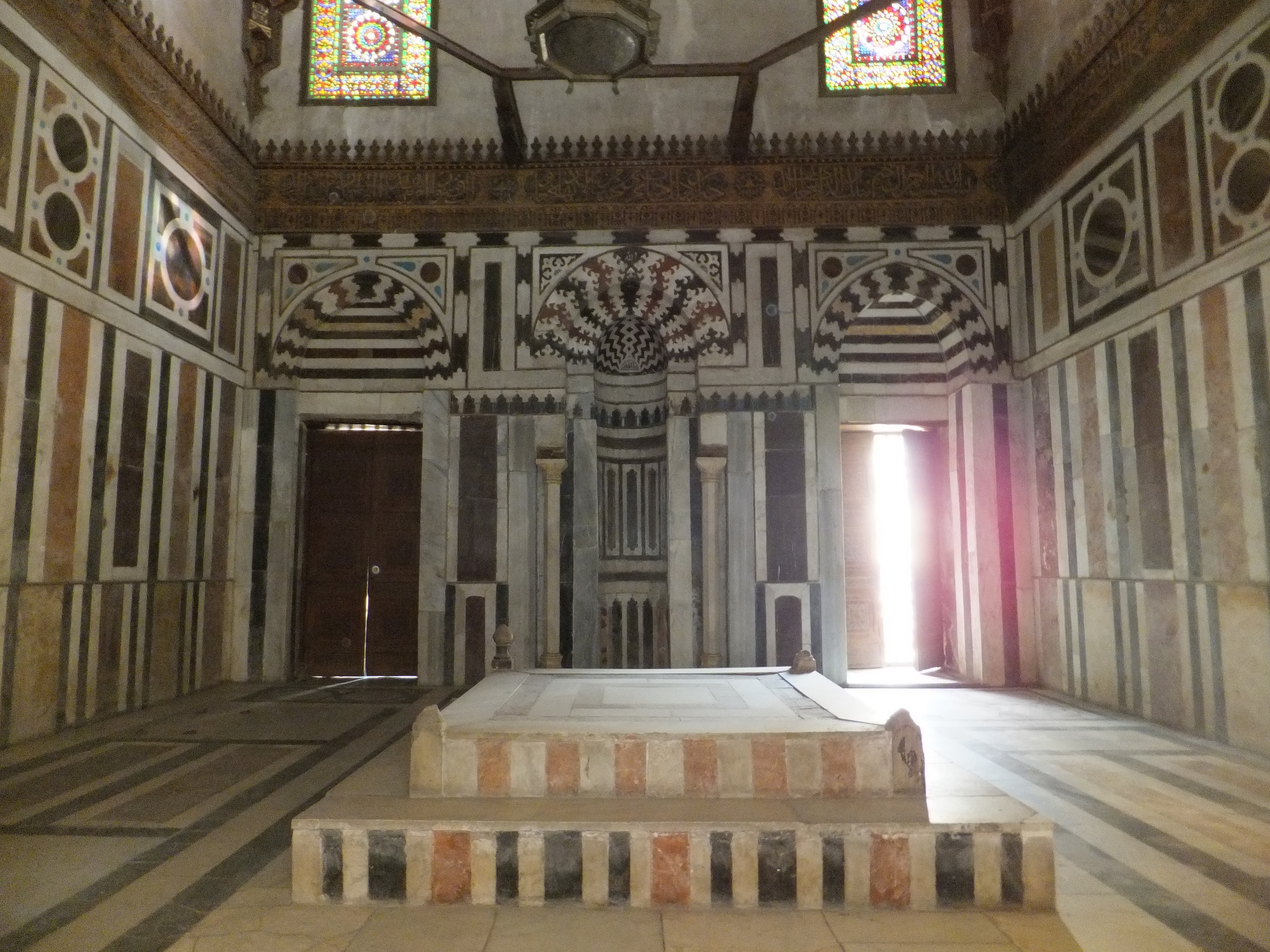
Interior of the mausoleum.

Adjoining the prayer hall on its northern side, but separated by a wall, is the mausoleum chamber under the dome. The dome itself was originally made of wood but was reconstructed in brick by the Comité in 1893. The transition between the round dome above and the square chamber below is achieved by the original (though restored) wooden pendentives with muqarnas forms and with gilded decoration of similar quality to that on the prayer hall ceiling. The mihrab and qibla wall here also have marble decoration, much like the qibla wall in the prayer hall, except that the mihrab here is noticeably narrower. The mihrab was possibly designed this way so as to allow the flanking windows to be wide enough for Qur'an reciters to sit in them, from where they could be heard by those passing on the street outside. As mentioned above, Barquq himself was not buried here in the end, but the chamber contains the tomb of one of his daughters, Fatima.

== Conservation and theft ==
The original dome was built from wood that was covered in lead. The dome had to be reconstructed in 1893 using bricks. Between May 2013 and February 2014, there were attempts made by the Museum of Fine Arts in Boston to conserve the minbar door. They also aimed to study the intricate wood work that is characteristic of Mamluk style. The frame of the door was found to be made of Aleppo pine and was inlaid with ebony and ivory. Furthermore, the ivory plaques were found to have green and red fill. The red fills were made up of a combination of beeswax and hematite and the green fills were made up of copper salts. They also utilized Carbon-14 dating, which determined that all elements of the wood originate as from the 14th and 15th centuries. X-ray imaging was utilized to determine the appropriate stabilization method. The original minbar of the mosque was stolen and replaced by the current minbar in the fifteenth century. The mosque has also been a target of more recent thefts in December 2012 and 2013, where much of the ornaments on the minbar and mosque door were stolen.

== See also ==
- Islam in Egypt
- List of madrasas in Egypt
- List of mausoleums in Egypt
- List of mosques in Cairo
