= Madrasa of al-Nasir Muhammad =

Medieval school and mausoleum in Cairo, Egypt

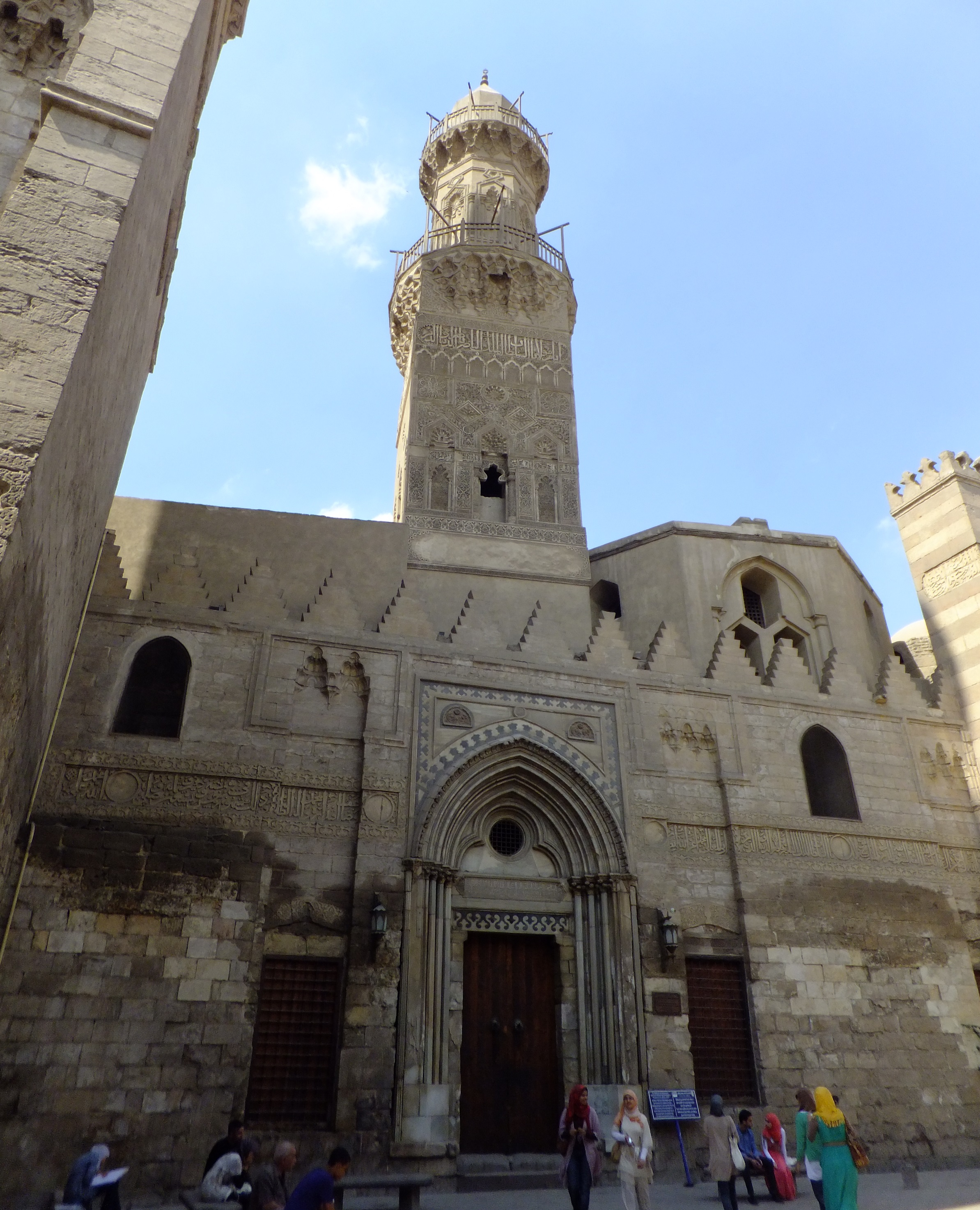

Religion
- Affiliation: Islam
- Ecclesiastical or organizational status: Madrassa; Mausoleum
- Status: Active

Location
- Location: al-Muizz Street, Bayn al-Qasrayn, Islamic Cairo
- Country: Egypt
- Interactive map of Madrasa of al-Nasir Muhammad
- Coordinates: 30°02′59″N 31°15′40″E

Architecture
- Type: Madrassa and mausoleum
- Style: Mamluk; Islamic
- Founder: al-Adil Kitbugha; al-Nasir Muhammad
- Groundbreaking: c. 1295 CE
- Completed: 1303 CE

Specifications
- Dome: 1
- Minaret: 1
- Materials: Brick, marble, stucco

The Madrasa of al-Nasir Muhammad is a madrasa and mausoleum located in the Bayn al-Qasrayn area of al-Muizz street in Islamic Cairo, Egypt. It was built in the name of the Mamluk sultan al-Nasir Muhammad ibn Qalawun, but its construction began between 1294 and 1295 under the reign of Sultan al-Adil Kitbugha, who was sultan in between al-Nasir Muhammad's first and seconds reigns. When al-Nasir Muhammad returned to the throne in 1299 he oversaw its construction until its completion in 1303. It is located adjacent to the earlier Qalawun complex, and the later Madrasa of Sultan Barquq.

== Historical background ==
Al-Nasir Muhammad was the ninth Mamluk sultan of Egypt, the youngest son of Sultan Qalawun, and lived from 1285 to 1341. He was inaugurated as sultan three times, from 1293 to 1294, from 1299 to 1309, and from 1309 to 1341. In December 1293, al-Nasir Muhammad's older brother Sultan al-Ashraf Khalil was assassinated, leaving the throne to the 9-year-old al-Nasir Muhammad. For his first two reigns al-Nasir Muhammad played the role of a nominal sultan, with his vice sultan and viziers being the active rulers due to his young age. By the time of his third reign al-Nasir Muhammad was 24 years old and took full command of the Mamluk Sultanate. This period passed with no major conflicts, and marked the high point for Mamluk power in Egypt. Al-Nasir Muhammad set into motion many public works such as the construction of canals, squares, madrasas, and mosques.

This madrasa was begun by Sultan al-Adil Kitbugha, who ruled from 1294 to 1296 (in between al-Nasir Muhammad's first and second reigns), but it was taken over and completed by al-Nasir Muhammad during his second reign (1299–1309). The Islamic historian al-Nuwayri records that al-Adil Kitbugha built the mausoleum along with the prayer iwan, and al-Nasir Muhammad completed the construction of the building and added the minaret. Also, the Islamic historian al-Maqrizi reports that al-Adil Kitbugha oversaw construction of the building up to the top of the inscription band, and al-Nasir Muhammad carried out the rest of its construction. It was inaugurated in 1303, when the minaret was added.

Al-Nasir Muhammad was never buried in the mausoleum named after him. He was afraid of unrest after his death because of the rivalry between his emirs, and chose to be buried in secret at his father's mausoleum, the mausoleum of Sultan Qalawun. However, it is the burial site of his mother Bint Sukbay and his son Anuk.

== Architecture ==
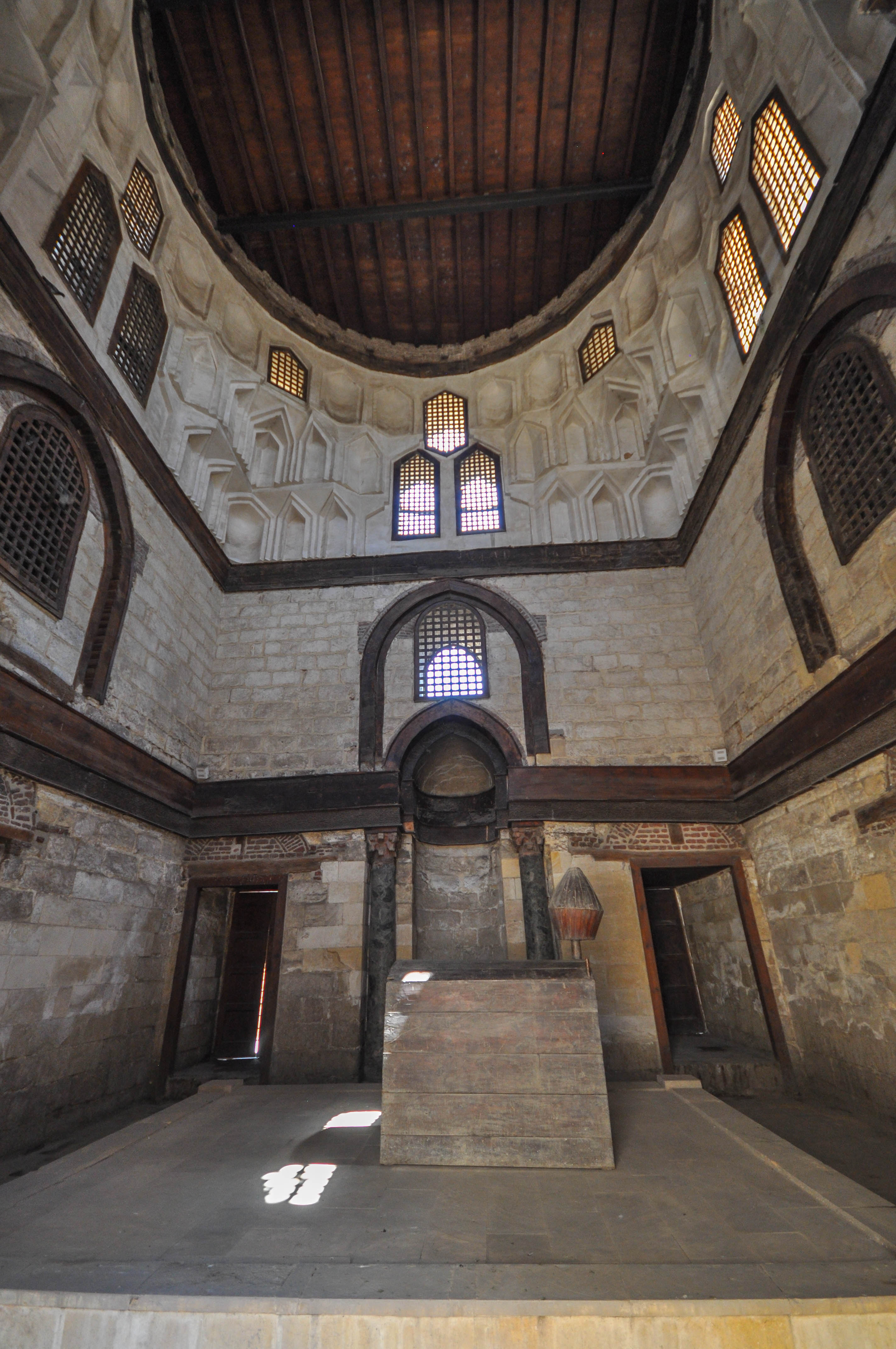
Interior of the mausoleum

=== General overview ===
The Madrasa of al-Nasir Muhammad is located next to the mausoleum complex of his father, Sultan Qalawun, and that of the later Sultan Barquq, in the Bayn al-Qasrayn area. It is made of brick and has stucco designs and inscriptions on the exterior and interior. The inscription along the façade is in the name of al-Nasir Muhammad, but ends with the original foundation date of 1296. This implies that, after regaining the throne in 1299, al-Nasir Muhammad replaced al-Adil Kitbugha’s name with his own without altering the second part of the inscription.

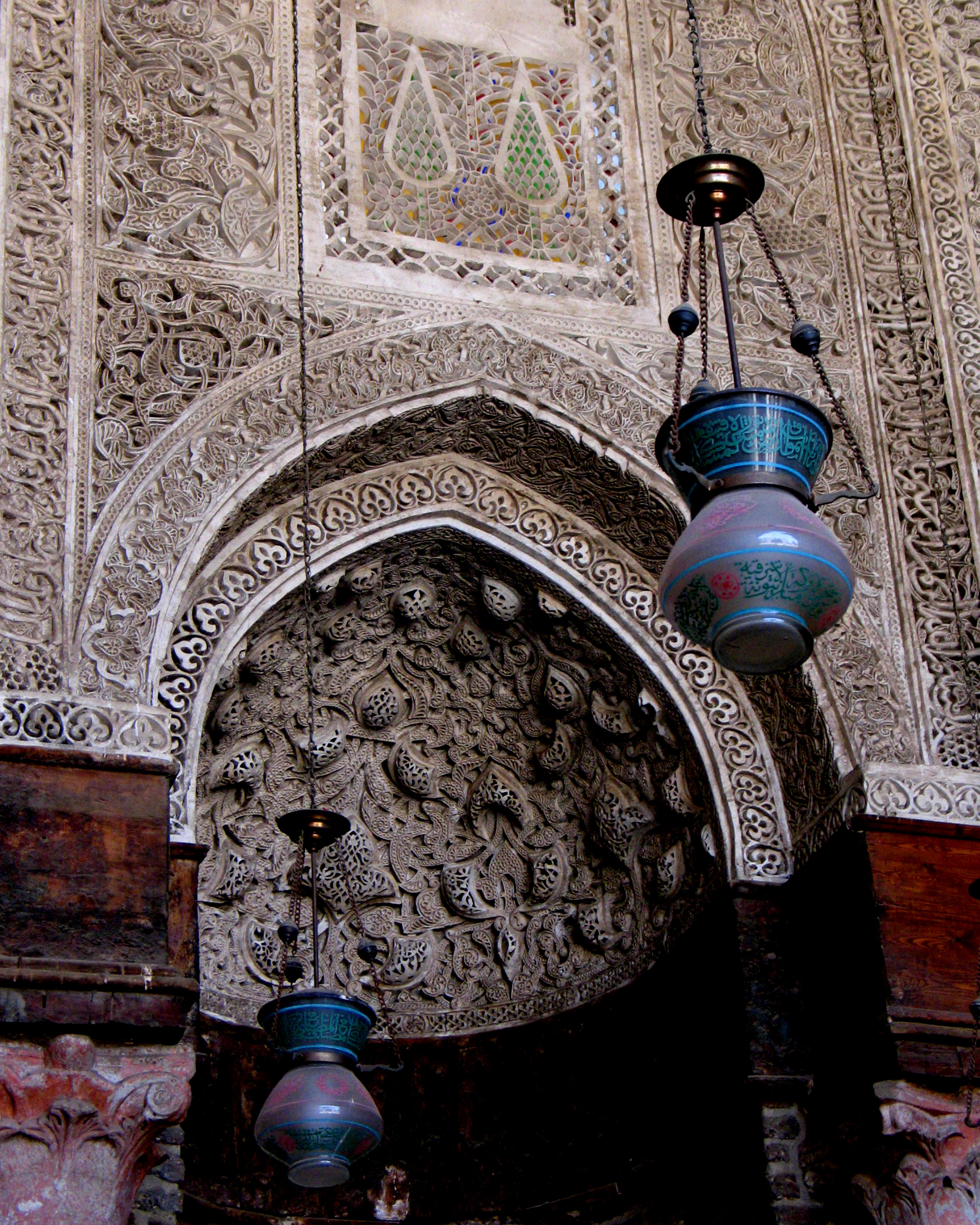
The mihrab in the Madrasa of al-Nasir Muhammad

The Madrasa of al-Nasir Muhammad is one of only three madrasas in Cairo that housed all four of the Sunni schools of jurisprudence. The madrasa is home to the last stucco mihrab (niche indicating the direction of prayer) in Egypt, unique for its raised, egg-shaped stucco bosses in high relief with punched ornament decorating the hood of the mihrab. The style is highly reminiscent of stucco carving produced in Tabriz, Iran under Mongol Ilkhanid rule and historians have suggested that it was crafted by artists from Mongol Iran or Tabriz. Aside from the mihrab, relatively little decoration has survived overall in the interior of al-Nasir Muhammad's building.

The domed mausoleum is separated from the madrasa by the main entrance corridor, from which it is accessed. Looking across the main entrance corridor are windows in the madrasa and the mausoleum that visually link the two. This is essentially the same layout as the mausoleum-madrasa of Sultan Qalawun (his father) next door. The dome of the mausoleum collapsed in 1870 and was never replaced, leaving only the drum of the dome visible today. A simple wooden roof now covers the space once covered by the dome.

=== The portal ===
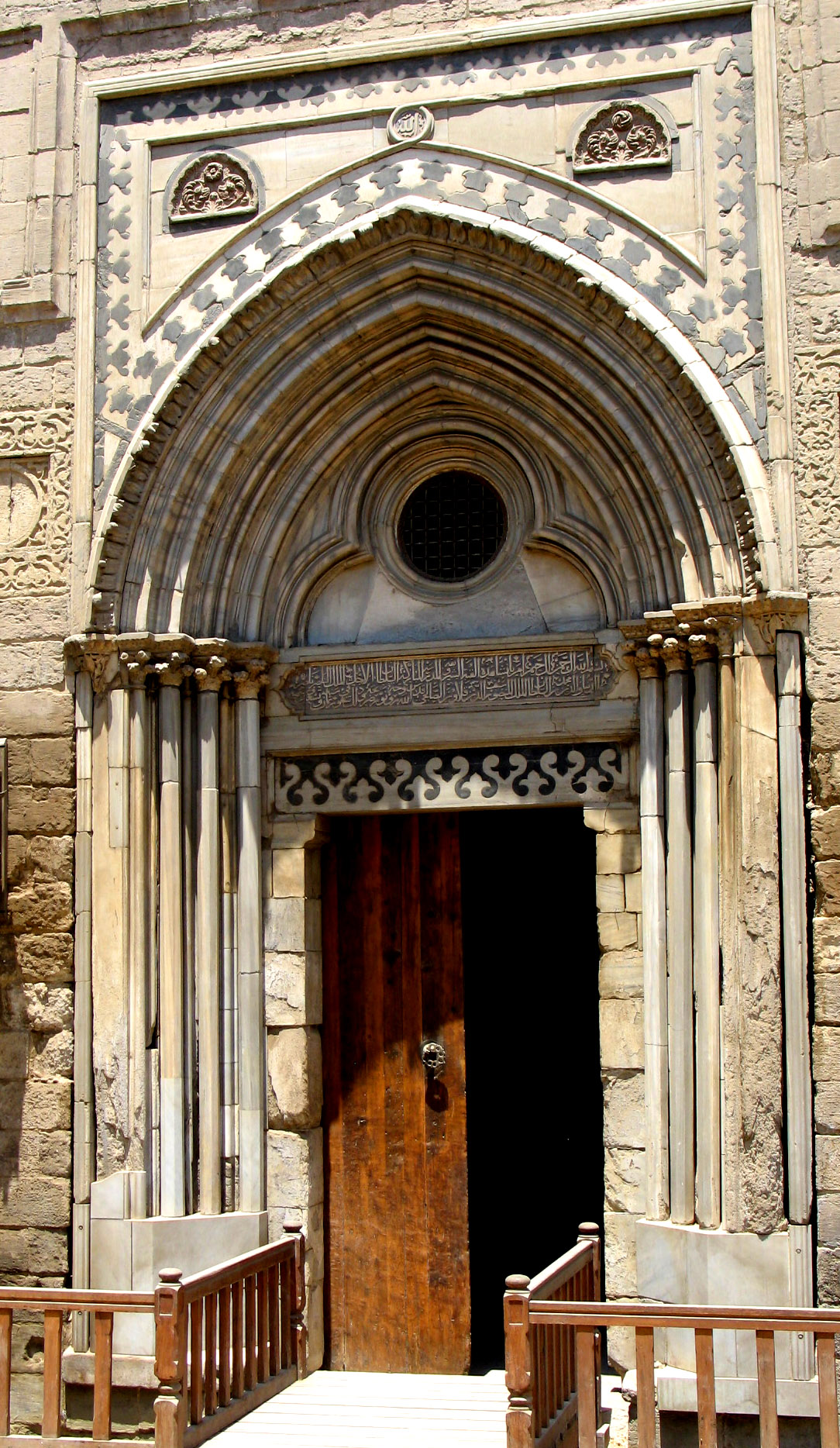
Gothic portal of the madrasa, a spolia from a church in Acre

The most unique aspect of the Madrasa of al-Nasir Muhammad is its gothic marble portal, acquired from a church in the city of Acre after al-Ashraf Khalil's victory against the Crusaders in 1291. The identification of the church in question is debated: some sources state it was the Church of Saint Andrew, while other sources name the Church of St Agnes or the Church of Saint John the Baptist. According to medieval Muslim historian al-Maqrizi, after the battle Khalil appointed his emir ʿAlam al-Din Sanjar al-Shujaʿi al-Mansuri (Arabic: عَلَمُ الدِّينِ سَنْجَرُ الشُّجَاعِيُّ المَنْصُورِيُّ) "to destroy the city walls and demolish its churches". When the emir came upon the church with this portal as its gate he decided to transport it in its entirety back to Cairo. He kept it for the rest of Khalil's reign and for all of al-Nasir Muhammad's first reign, but it was seized from him by Sultan al-Adil Kitbugha and used in this madrasa.

The portal "consists of a pointed arch with a triple recess flanked by three slender columns on each side". At the top of the arch "Allah" has been inscribed. Al-Maqrizi praised this portal for its craftsmanship, saying "Its gate is among the most amazing things the sons of Adam have crafted, for it is made from one piece of white marble, marvelous in form and exalted in workmanship". Although there are several other distinguished portals in mosques and madrasas within Cairo, this gateway holds historical significance, acting as a trophy for the Muslim victory over the Crusaders. Al-Maqrizi's high praise for this portal could be due to this added sentimental value or its exotic appeal.

=== The minaret ===
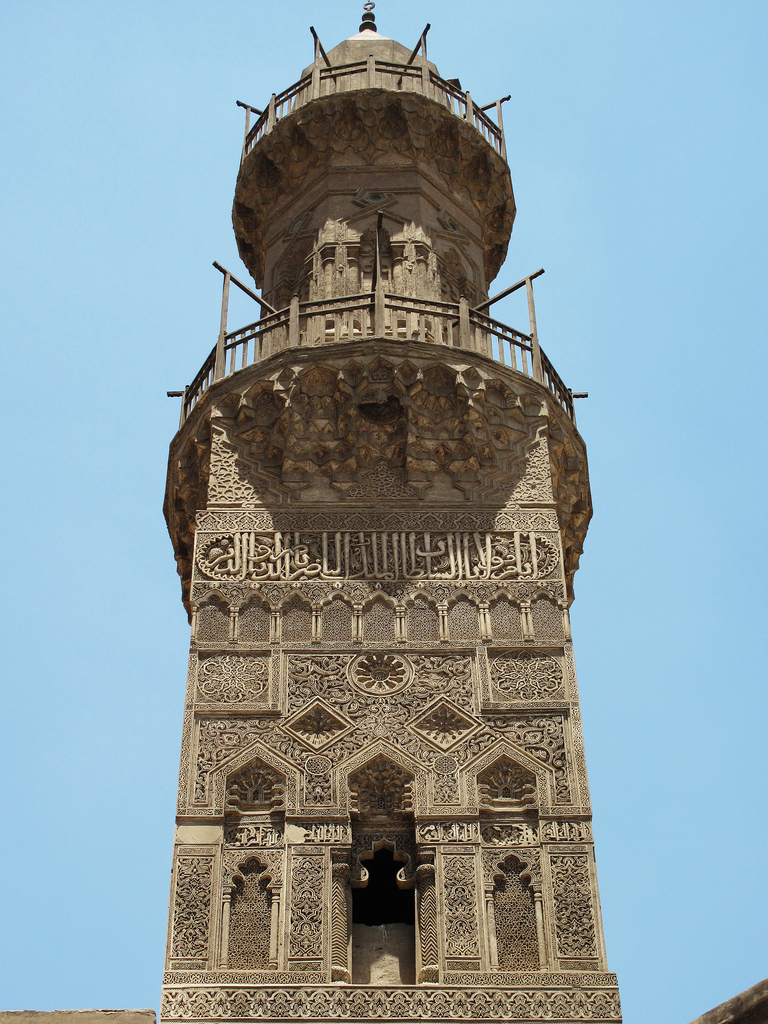
The minaret of the Madrasa of al-Nasir Muhammad

The highly stylized and decorated stucco designs on the lower rectangular section of this minaret add another element of uniqueness to the Madrasa of al-Nasir Muhammad. This is one of the only remaining stucco minarets in Cairo, and includes decorations of medallions, keel-arched niches, and sections filled with geometric and floral patterns. The medallions and keel-arched niches are similar to those of earlier Fatimid and Ayyubid decoration, and the floral patterns are characteristic of stucco carvings from this period. Some of the geometric patterns resemble those used in the mihrab of the al-Azhar Mosque. A band of Kufic script runs through the lower decorative arcade, while a large inscription in Thuluth script crowns the top of the rectangular section, just below a balcony of sculpted muqarnas, and contains the name of al-Nasir Muhammad. Some historians have suggested that the quality and density of the stucco work here indicates the involvement of Maghribi or Andalusi craftsmen in its creation.

The minaret is also unusual in that it was built directly above the entrance portal and on top of the main entrance corridor, a design decision that was rare in Mamluk architecture which usually places minarets on their own solid buttresses aside from the entrance in order to ensure greater stability.

Only the bottom rectangular section is original, the second story was most likely added by Sultan Inal as it resembles another stone minaret he built in his name. It has an octagonal shaft and green glass or ceramic elements that fill the mouldings that run around its keel-arched panels. The uppermost section above this is probably from the Ottoman era.

== See also ==
- Islam in Egypt
- List of madrasas in Egypt
- List of mausoleums in Cairo
