= Bayn al-Qasrayn =

District and plaza in old Cairo

Coordinates: 30.0505°N 31.2615°E

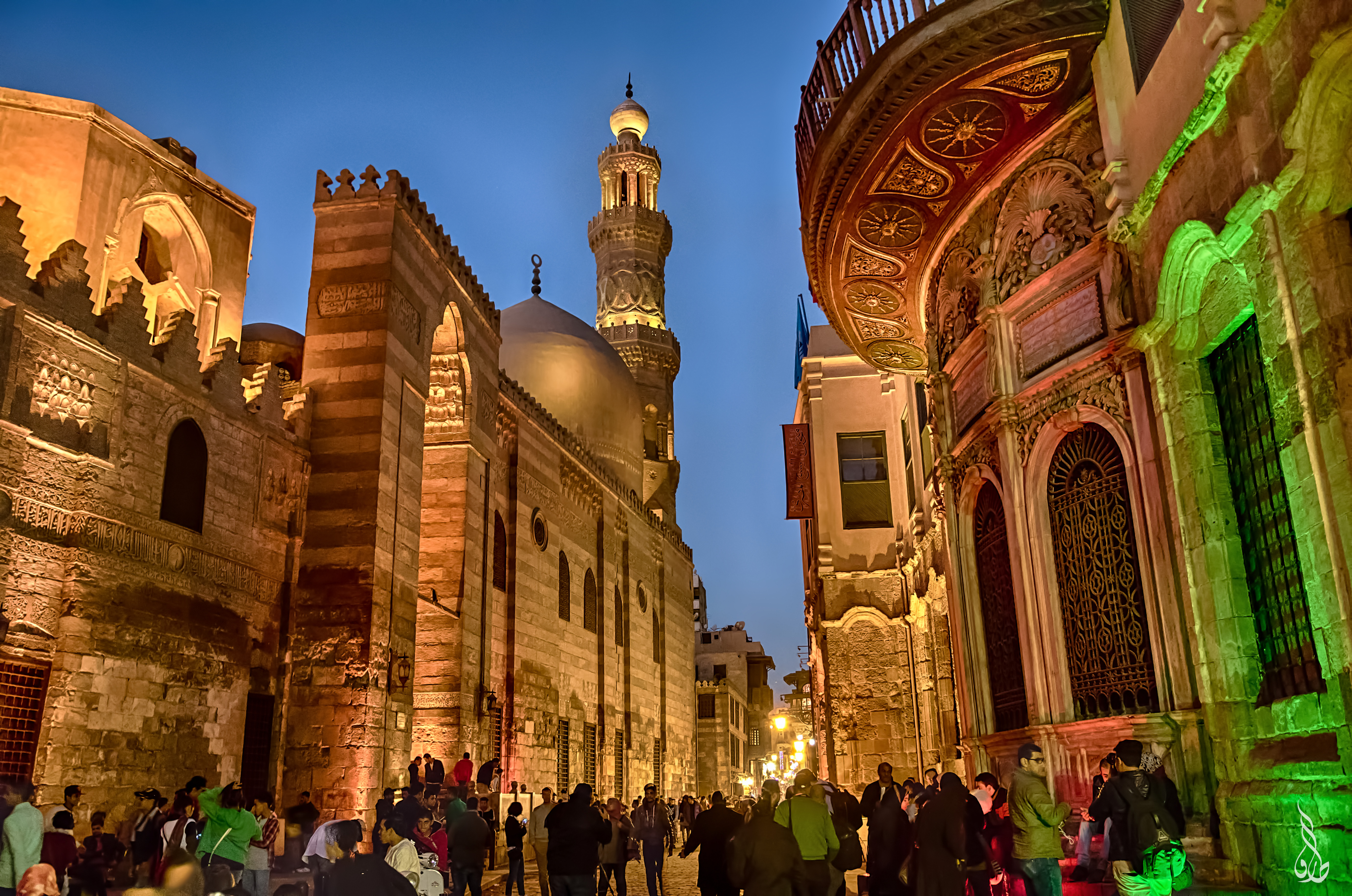
Bayn al-Qasrayn and its monuments illuminated at night.

Bayn al-Qasrayn (Arabic: بين القصرين, lit. 'between the two palaces') is an area located along al-Mu'izz Street in the center of medieval Islamic Cairo, within present day Cairo, Egypt. It corresponds to what was formerly a plaza between two palace complexes constructed in the 10th century by the Fatimids, as part of their palace-city named al-Qahirah (now Cairo). This later became the site of many monumental buildings constructed during the Ayyubid, Mamluk, and Ottoman periods, up to the 19th century. Many of these historical monuments are still standing today.

== History ==
=== Fatimid founding ===
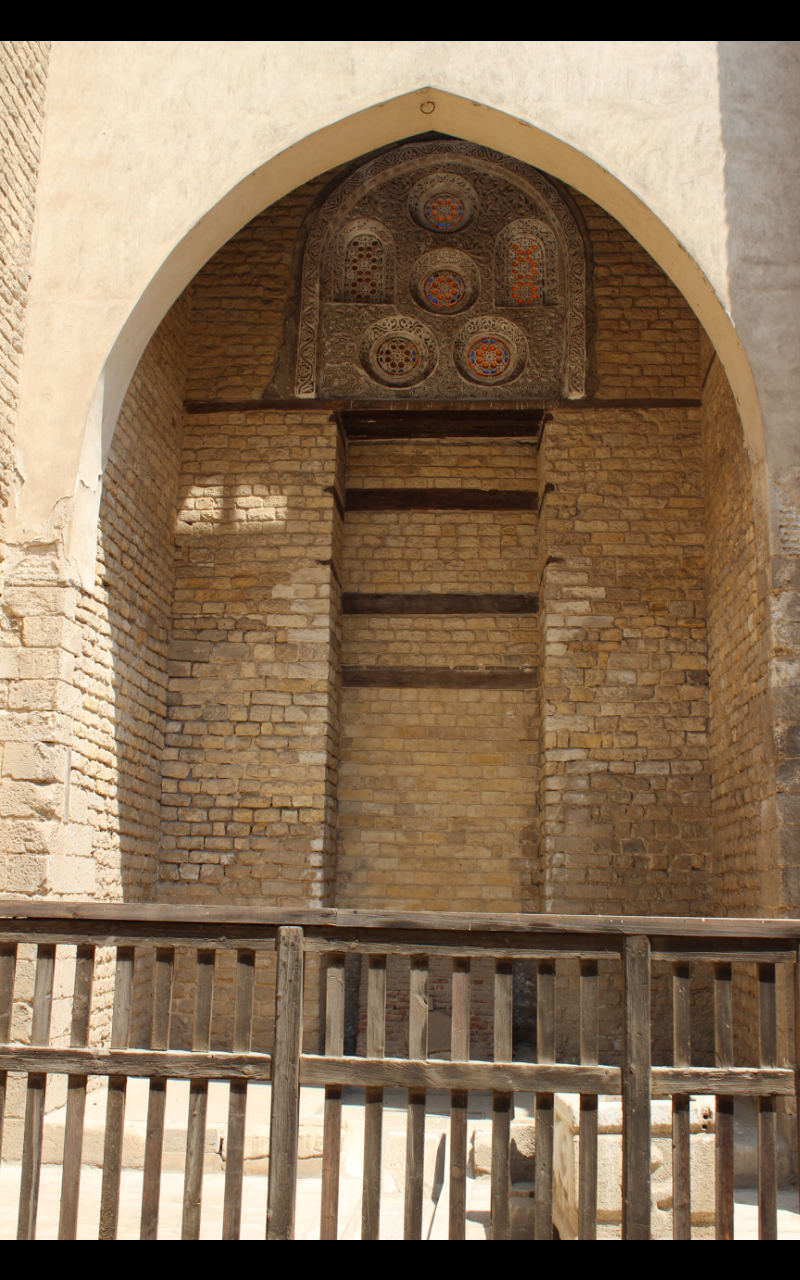
An iwan in the maristan (hospital) of Sultan Qalawun which incorporates remains from the Fatimid Western Palace which previously stood here.

The Fatimids conquered Egypt in 969 under the command of al-Siqilli, the general of Caliph Al-Mu'izz li-Din Allah. In 970, Jawhar was responsible for planning, founding, and constructing a new city to serve as the residence and center of power for the Fatimid Caliphs. The city was located northeast of Fustat, the existing capital and main city of Egypt. Jawhar, who served as al-Mu'izz's Grand Vizier and was most likely an Armenian slave, is recounted by 14th-century Egyptian Islamic historian, Al-Maqrizi, to have made the conscious decision to move further north and build Cairo on a 340-acre complex instead of develop Fustat. Jawhar organized the city so that the caliphal palace complex was at its center. The city was named al-Mu'izziyya al-Qahirah, the "Victorious City of al-Mu'izz", later simply called "al-Qahira", which gave us the modern name of Cairo. Although Jawhar was indeed important to the layout of Cairo, the Great Eastern Palace of Al-Mu'izz li-Din Allah was drawn and designed by the hand of Al-Mu'izz li-Din Allah, himself. Al-Mu'izz li-Din Allah's palace was finished in the year 996, but underwent renovations with Caliph Al-Mustansir Billah in the year 1058.

The palace complex consisted of two main parts: the Great Eastern Palace, the first to be built in 970 by Jawhar for the arrival of the triumphant Caliph al-Mu'izz, and the Western Palace, which was added under his successor al-'Aziz (ruled 975–996). The two palaces faced each other across an open square or plaza which became known as "Bayn al-Qasrayn" (meaning "Between the Two Palaces"), on a pattern repeated from the original Fatimid royal city at al-Mahdia, Tunisia. The official entrance to the Great Eastern Palace, known as Bab al-Dhahab ("The Golden Gate") was located here and led to the "Golden Hall" where the caliph held his daily audience. Once the Lesser (Western) Palace of Al-Aziz Billah and a smaller palace Qasr Al-Bahr were built on the west side of the street, the Meidan (also spelled "Maydan") or center square completed the Fatimid Great Palaces and centralized the parade ground. The Meidan became known afterwards as "Bayn Al-Qasrayn", due to its location between the two palaces. The Bayn Al-Qasrayn area was also crossed by underground tunnels to which allowed the Caliph to travel back and forth between the palace and the caliphal gardens to the west. These private-use tunnels aided the caliph and royal officials to avoid larger-than-expected gatherings and to cross the area inconspicuously.

The large-scale parade ground symbolized Fatimid success in trade and political control. This power was acknowledged in outer regions like Mecca and Medina, where the rulers in those areas allied to receive assistance and subsidies for protection and inclusion. The inclusion of everyday Muslims, Jews, and Copts to Fatimid daily life and royal presentations led to the palace guards closing the central throughway with chains during the nighttime hours to seclude and respect the Caliph as a leader for all. The square was also the site of various ceremonies and activities related to the dynasty. Social and artistic usages found in architectural decoration, court ritual, and open ceremony have been recorded through the Islamic dynasties of Cairo since the Fatimid Dynasty.

Bayn al-Qasrayn was the center of life throughout the centuries of Fatimid control in Egypt. At its northern end, right above the Great Palace complex was the Aqmar Mosque. As the Fatimids were Shia Ismai'lis, this Fatimid Mosque became a piece of street architecture with its motifs and tributes to Allah, Muhammad and Ali on its daily attention attracting façade. This mosque became pivotal to teaching Shi'i Islamic religious concepts in the early twelfth century. Besides the royal, religious and state presentations on the parade grounds of Bayn Al-Qasrayn, the surrounding area had markets and businesses. The shops would pay dues via the waqf, a system of charitable endowments, that contributed to the functioning and progression of education and religious protection of Shi'i theology. This would include shops with food stuffs, armory bazaars, money changing and other widely diverse market fronts.

=== Ayyubid and Mamluk development ===
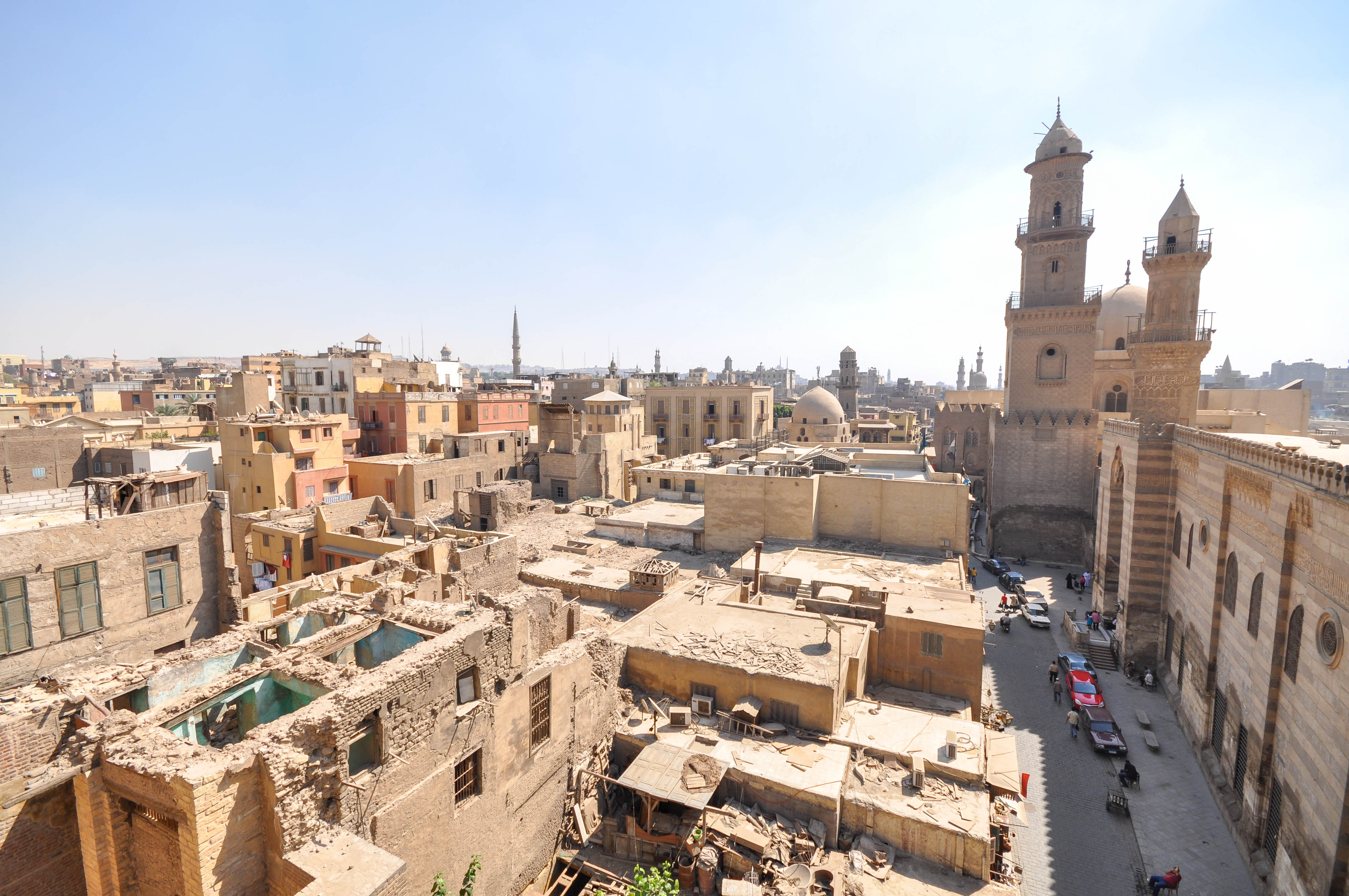
A view of Bayn al-Qasrayn from above. The Qalawun complex, al-Nasir Muhammad complex, and Barquq complex are on the right. A mix of other buildings stands across from them.

Over the subsequent centuries, Cairo developed into a full-scale urban center. After the end of the Fatimid Caliphate in the 12th century, the Ayyubid sultans and their Mamluk successors, who were Sunni Muslims eager to erase the influence of the Shi'a Muslim Fatimids, progressively demolished and replaced the great Fatimid palaces with their own buildings. The al-Salihiyya Madrasa, built by al-Salih Ayyub, was one of the first such major constructions, and his mausoleum (built after his death by Shajarr ad-Durr), is the first post-Fatimid mausoleum to be erected in a public location along Cairo's main streets; a practice that would become common thereafter.

The ceremonial square consequently shrank and eventually became merely another stretch of the Qasabah, the main north–south street of Cairo (known now as Al-Mu'izz Street). Nonetheless, due to its central and symbolic location, the Bayn al-Qasrayn area remained a privileged site in Cairo, and many major mosques, mausoleums, and mansions of rulers and elites were built along the former plaza, particularly in the Mamluk era. Structures such as Sultan Qalawun's mausoleum, hospital, and madrasa, a major monument of its time, not only made use of the location but also discretely incorporated parts of the old Fatimid palaces into its construction. Ibn Batutah, who visited in 1326, reinforced this concept and commented that the space of Bayn al-Qasrayn was, “beyond one's ability to describe.”

== Urban context: the Qasabah Street ==
The main north–south street of Cairo which passed through Bayn al-Qasrayn, became known as the "Qasabah", the city's main street or avenue. (Note: The Arabic word "qasabah" (Arabic: قَـصْـبَـة), often spelled "kasbah" elsewhere, has various related meanings, in this case referring to the central part of the city.) Today this street is known as Al-Mu'izz Street.

This was the main commercial axis of the city, where the most important economic activities were centered. Shops along here included book dealers, spice and nut suppliers, saddle makers, and cloth merchants who sold their goods to the people of Cairo and to other visitors. The Egyptian historian Al-Maqrizi counted 12,000 shops on the Qasabah street alone. Even after the Fatimid era, this avenue was the focus of many civic or religious monuments built by subsequent rulers and governors up to the 19th century, including many major mosques and mausoleums.

The Qasabah street spread both north and south from the original Bayn al-Qasrayn into a mile-long street which extended from the northern gate of the city (Bab al-Futuh) to the southern gate (Bab Zuweila). As Cairo expanded further outside the original Fatimid walled city, development of the Qasaba street extended to the road leading south from the city and reached as far as the Qarafa necropolis.

== List of historic monuments at Bayn al-Qasrayn today ==
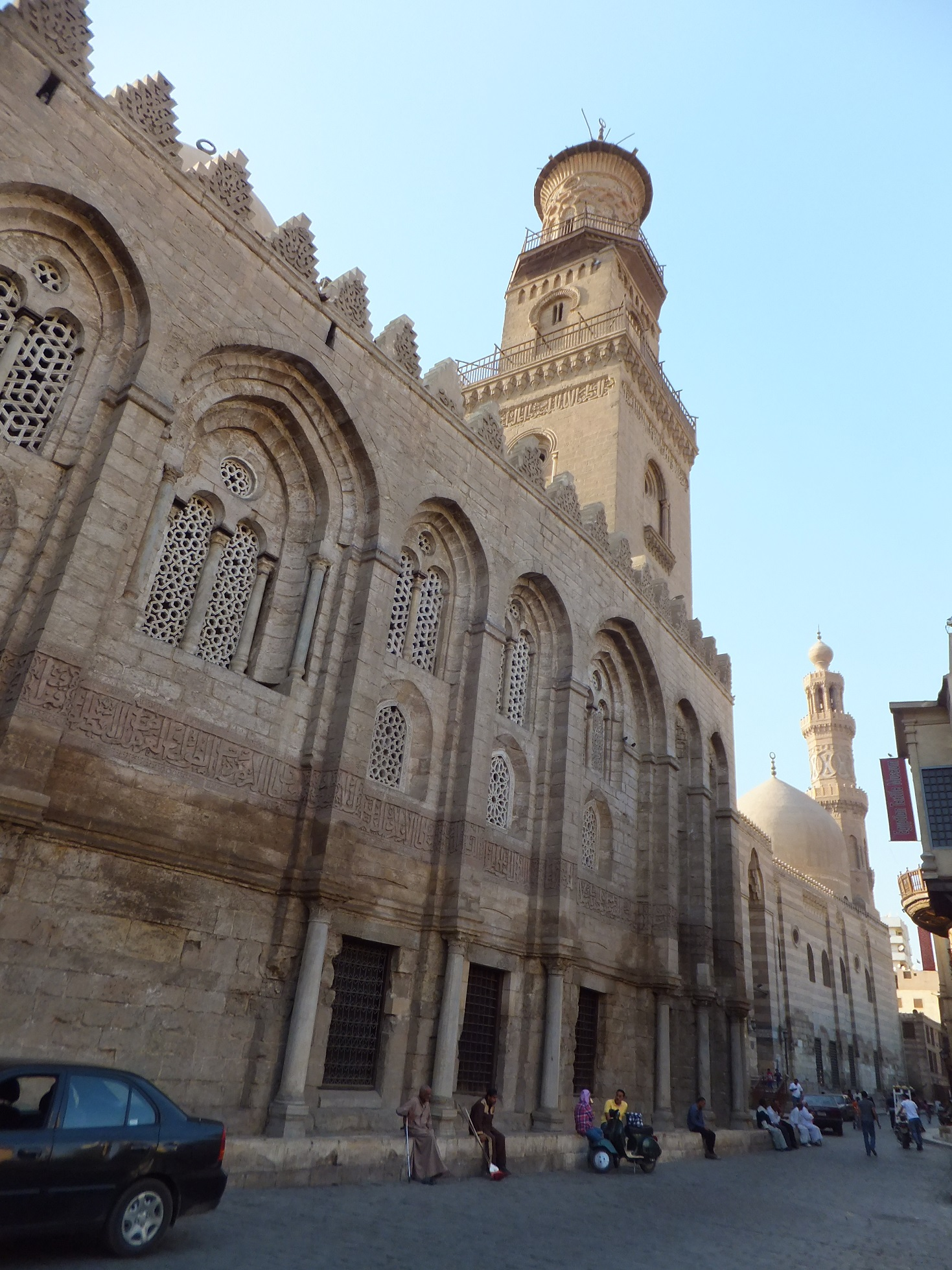
The Qalawun mausoleum complex at Bayn al-Qasrayn.

While Bayn al-Qasrayn is not a strictly defined area today, the following monuments occupy the former site of the two great Fatimid Palaces, roughly in order from south to north. The prominence of structures originating from royal patronage is an indication of the location's historical prestige.

- Madrasa and mausoleum of Sultan al-Salih Ayyub
- Madrasa of Sultan Baybars (the earliest Mamluk monument, but only a fragment of it remains today)
- Funerary complex (mausoleum, madrasa, and hospital) of Sultan Qalawun (still contains some remnants of the western Fatimid palace)
- Funerary complex (mausoleum and madrasa) of Sultan al-Nasir Muhammad
- Funerary complex (mausoleum and khanqah) of Sultan Barquq
- Sabil and school of Isma'il Pasha (19th century)
- Madrasa of Sultan al-Kamil Ayyub (the earliest post-Fatimid monument)
- Hammam of Sultan Inal
- Palace of Amir Bashtak
- Sabil-kuttab of Abd al-Rahman Katkhuda
- al-Aqmar Mosque (the only remaining Fatimid monument)
