= Fatimid Great Palaces =

Palace complex built during the Fatimid Caliphate

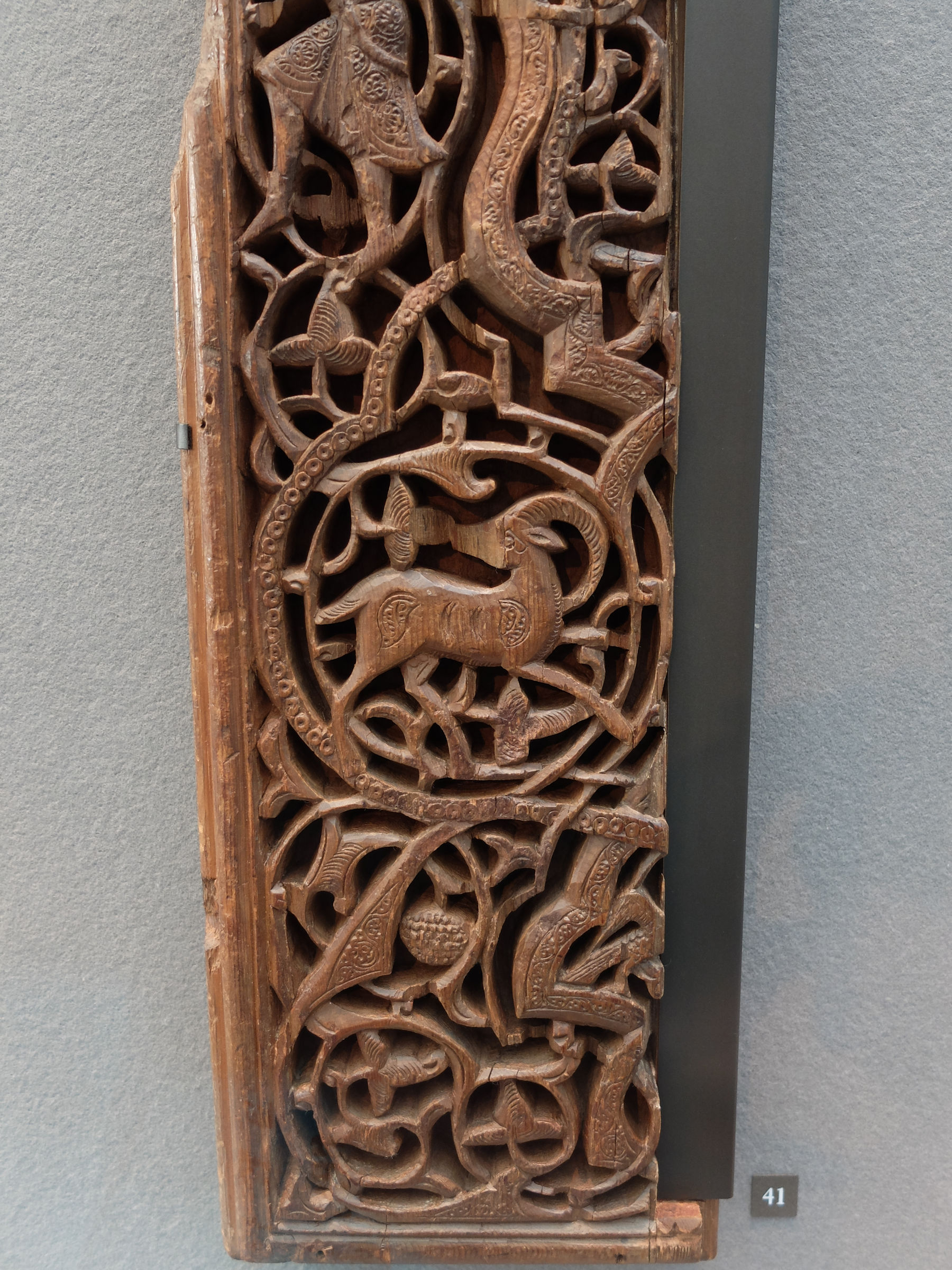
Carved wooden panel with images of animals and humans, believed to have belonged to a door in one of the Fatimid palaces. (On display at the Louvre.)

The Great Palaces of the Fatimid Caliphs (or Great Fatimid Palaces, among other name variants) were a vast and lavish palace complex built in the late 10th century in Cairo, Egypt, to house the Fatimid caliphs, their households, and the administration of their state. There were two main palace complexes, the Eastern and the Western Palace. They were located in the center of the walled city of Cairo around the area still known today as Bayn al-Qasrayn ("Between the Two Palaces").

== Overview and background ==
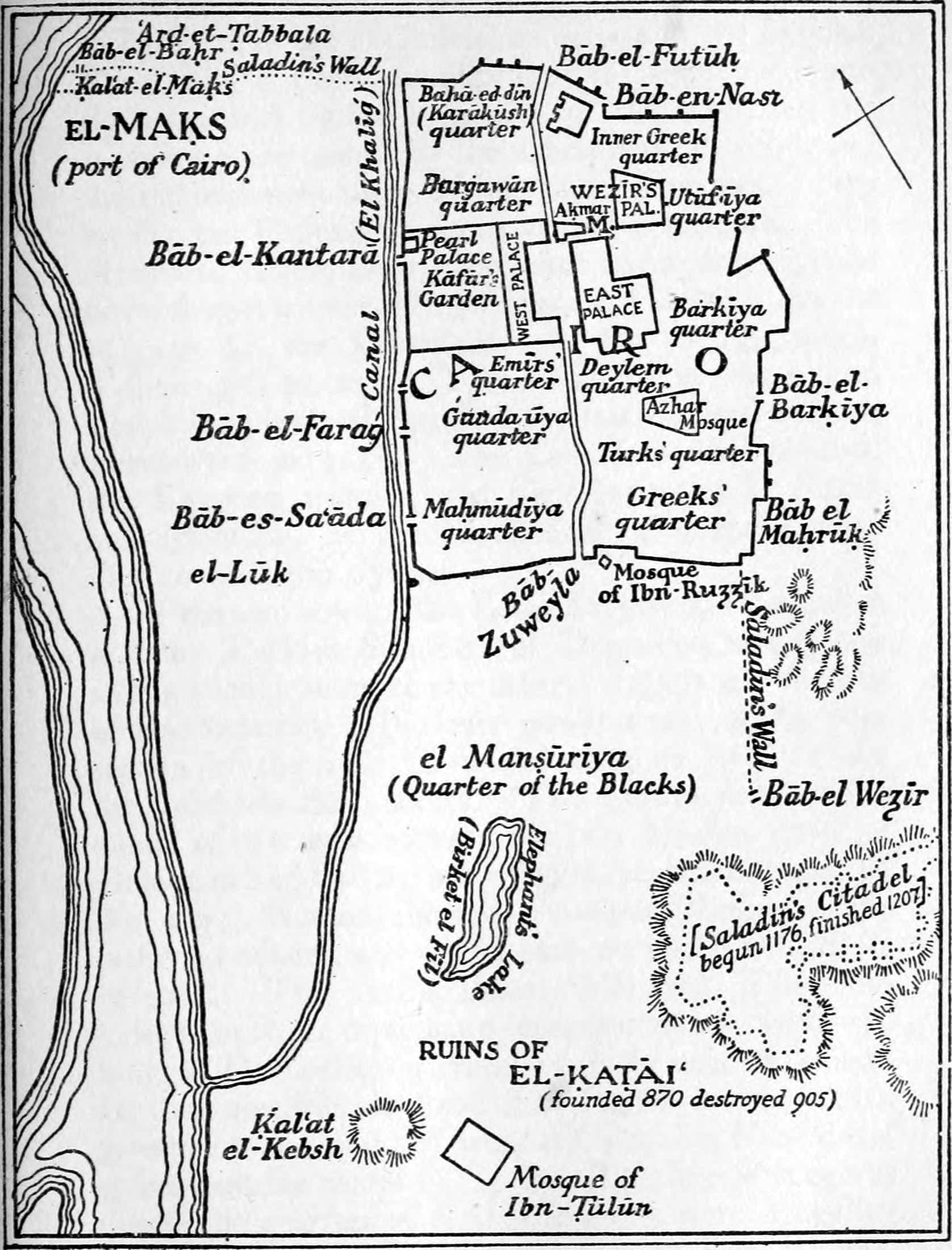
A plan of Fatimid Cairo (before 1200 CE), as reconstructed by Stanley Lane-Poole, showing the approximate layout of the city and the location of the palaces.

The Fatimids were a Shia Muslim Caliphate that initially controlled Ifriqiya, where they founded their first capital at Mahdia. They then conquered Egypt in 969 CE with a North African Kutama Berber army under the command of the general Jawhar al-Siqilli. In 970, Jawhar was responsible for planning, founding, and constructing a new city to serve as the residence and center of power for the Fatimid caliphs. The city was named al-Mu'izziyya al-Qahira, the "Victorious City of al-Mu'izz", later simply called "al-Qahira", which gave us the modern name of Cairo. The new city was located northeast of Fustat, the previous capital and main city of Egypt. Jawhar organized the city so that the caliphal palace complex was at its center, in addition to the main mosque, al-Azhar, to the southeast.

The palace complex consisted of two main parts: the Eastern Palace (or Great Palace), the first to be laid out in 970 by Jawhar for the arrival of the triumphant Caliph al-Mu'izz, and the Western Palace, which was added under his successor, Caliph al-'Aziz (r. 975–996). Together they served as the residences of the caliphs and their family throughout the Fatimid period, and were thus also known as the Dar al-Khilafa ("Abode of the Caliphate"). Information about the layout and appearance of these palaces comes from a few written reports, and especially from the chronicles of the Arab historian Maqrizi and of the Persian traveler Nasir Khusraw.

The two palaces faced each other across an open square or plaza which became known as Bayn al-Qasrayn (meaning "Between the Two Palaces"), on a pattern repeated from the original Fatimid royal city at al-Mahdiya, Tunisia. This square was rectangular and measured 105 by 255 meters (344 by 837 ft), taking up over 2.5 hectares (6.2 acres). It had great public and symbolic significance, and was the site of various ceremonies related to the dynasty. The grand official entrance to the Great Eastern Palace, known as Bab al-Dhahab ("The Golden Gate"), was located here.

== The Eastern Palace (Great Palace) ==
The Eastern Palace, also known as the Great Palace (al-Qasr al-Kabir), was the larger of the two, and is believed to have occupied about 9 ha (22 acres), or one-fifth of the total area of Cairo at the time. It was begun under al-Mu'izz and finished under al-Aziz, although work of various kinds continued for decades, even under al-Hakim and under the vizier al-Ma'mun al-Bata'ihi in the 12th century. The palace opened to the rest of the city through nine gates (three to the west, one to the north, three to the east, and two to the south), but it was also separated from the city around it by gardens and open squares. This sprawling but secluded layout in the center of the city kept with a tradition, already established by the Abbasid caliphs, of isolating the caliph from the public sphere. Members of the Isma'ili religious establishment (scholars and clerics) were also housed in or around the palace, which had its own muezzin and thus did not rely on the call to prayer of the al-Azhar Mosque. The Eastern Palace was composed of many great halls, the most important of which were preceded by courtyards (called dihliz). The palace also featured many gardens or courtyards, often bordered by porticos and featuring pavilions and fountains, where court life unfolded. Visitors who wrote about the palaces reported marble pavements of different colors, central fountains, gold fixtures and ornamentation, and animals on display to impress guests.

The palace's official grand entrance was through its central western gate called Bab al-Dhahab ("The Golden Gate"), which opened off the Bayn al-Qasrayn plaza. (Its location would have been facing the present-day Mausoleum of Qalawun across the street.) It apparently featured gold brought from Ifriqiya (present-day Tunisia). Above the gate was a balcony at which the caliph would appear to the public on occasions. This entrance led to the "Golden Hall" (Qa'at al-Dhahab or Dar al-Dhahab) via a vaulted passage around 30 meters long. The Golden Hall acted as a throne room where the caliph held his daily audiences and where official receptions and some religious festivals took place. Another important hall was known as the Great Iwan, which was crowned by a dome. This was the venue were the Isma'ili clerics and missionaries (da'is) would hold sermons for the palace residents, as well as some of the most important religious festivals. In this hall the caliph's seat was hidden behind a screen or grille known as the Shubbak al-Khalifa ("Caliph's Window"). Both the Golden Hall and the Great Iwan were built or completed under al-Aziz.

About one quarter of the palace to the northeast was taken up by a great square called Rahbat al-Eid ("Festival Square"), measuring 157 by 105 meters, which was the starting point for the caliph's processions through the city. One of the eastern gates, called Bab al-Zumurrud ("Emerald Gate"), opened off this square and gave access to the part of the palace known as the Emerald Palace, the private residence of the caliph. Another gate opening off the southern side of the square was called Bab al-Eid. An arsenal hall, called Khizanat al-Bunud (roughly the "Arsenal of Banners/Flags"), lay to the east of the palace, as did a gate known as Bab Qasr al-Sharq ("Eastern Palace Gate"). The southeastern gate, Bab Daylam ("Gate of the Daylamites"), led to the monument that later became the shrine of al-Husayn (see below), while the southwestern gate was called Bab Turbat al-Za'faraan (or Bab al-Za'faraan), after the name of the adjacent royal mausoleum (see below). The southwestern part of the palace was occupied by the kitchens, which also provided food for the poor during the fasting month of Ramadan. The southernmost of the western gates, located here, became known as Bab Zuhuma, named after the odors of food emanating from the kitchens. The only northern gate of the palace, Bab al-Rih ("Gate of the Wind"), was the entrance used by the da'is. This gate may also have been the last one to disappear in the post-Fatimid period, having survived at least until 1408 and having been seen by Maqrizi.

In the 12th century, the vizier al-Ma'mun al-Bata'ihi (in office from 1122 to 1125) added three more pavilions to the palace. He was also responsible for building the al-Aqmar Mosque, which still stands today, at the northwestern edge of the palace.

=== The mausoleum: Turbat al-Za'faraan ===
Attached to the southern end of the eastern palace was a mausoleum known as Turbat al-Za'faraan ("The Saffron Tomb"), which served as the burial site of the caliphs. Even the remains of the Fatimid caliphs in Tunisia were transferred here when the caliphate moved to Egypt. The tombs were eventually completely demolished by the Mamluk amir Jaharka al-Khalili to make way for the Khan al-Khalili in the late 14th century, which gave its name to the surrounding souq area still present today. Jaharkas reportedly disposed of the bones of the Fatimid royal family by throwing them into the rubbish hills east of the city.

Also adjacent to the caliphs' mausoleum was the later 12th-century shrine which allegedly housed the head of al-Husayn, the son of Ali ibn Abi Talib who was slain at the Battle of Karbala in 680 and is revered as a martyr by the Shi'a. His head was originally believed to be interred at Ascalon, but the Fatimids brought it to Cairo in 1153 when Ascalon was threatened by the Crusaders. Since the Fatimids claimed descent through al-Husayn's mother, Fatima, the creation of this shrine was an important symbolic and religious act. The shrine still exists today (albeit rebuilt many times) in the al-Hussein Mosque, which is heavily visited by Muslims.

== The Western Palace ==
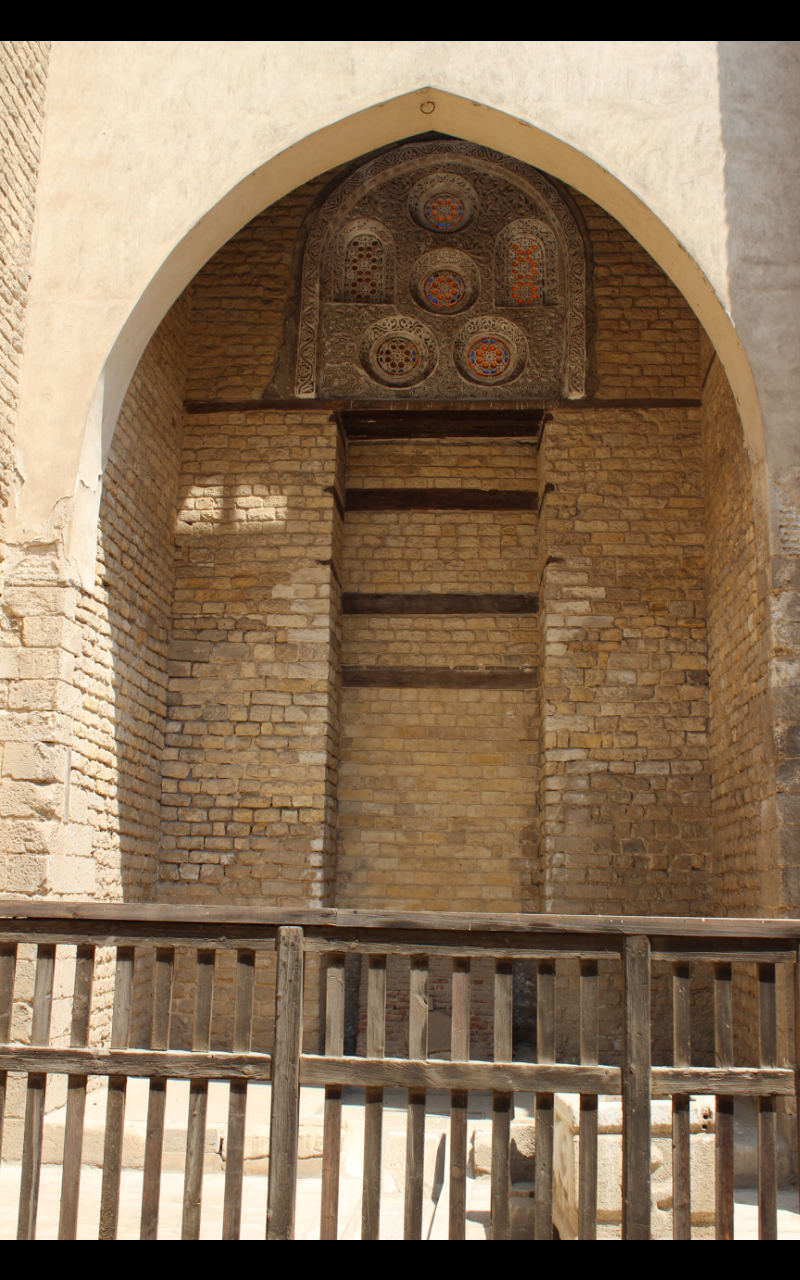
An iwan in the maristan (hospital) of Sultan Qalawun which incorporates remains from the Fatimid Western Palace which previously stood here.

The smaller Western Palace, also known as the Lesser Palace (Qasr al-Saghir al-Gharbi), was initially built as a residence for one of Caliph al-Aziz's daughters, Sitt al-Mulk (who was also de facto ruler between 1021 and 1023). It covered about 4.5 hectares and had two wings which wrapped around the south and north sides of the Bayn al-Qasrayn plaza. Less is known overall about this palace, as it was quickly replaced by other structures in the post-Fatimid era. The palace was built on the site of a vast, previously existing garden called al-Bustan al-Kafur (or al-Bustan al-Kafuri), which was originally established here by the Ikhshidid ruler Abu'l-Misk Kafur, who ruled Egypt before the Fatimids. The western part of the garden was retained for the Fatimids' pleasure and was initially reserved for the caliph's family. The Eastern and Western Palaces, as well as these gardens to the west, were all connected by large tunnels that allowed the caliphs to get from one to the other by horse. The Western Palace was refurbished in 1064 by Caliph al-Mustansir who had hoped to house the Abbasid caliphs, his Sunni rivals, after having briefly deposed them in Baghdad for a year (in 1058–59); however, this purpose was never served. The palace was also known as Qasr al-Bahr ("Palace of the Sea/River") in reference to the fact that it lay near the Khalij canal, which passed next to Cairo and which once extended to the Red Sea.

== Other nearby Fatimid palaces and facilities ==
Throughout the Fatimid period various other minor palaces and establishments were also built in the areas surrounding the caliphs' palaces. To the south of both palaces were a set of stables. The vizier's palace, the Dar al-Wizara, was located northeast of the Eastern Palace, on the site of the current Khanqah of Sultan Baybars al-Jashnakir and the Madrasa of Amir Qarasunqur. It was built by the vizier al-Afdal (son of the famous vizier Badr al-Gamali) after 1094. Caliph al-Hakim (between 996 and 1021) or al-Amir (in 1116) added next to the southern end of the Western Palace an academy known as the Dar al-'ilm (roughly "House of Knowledge/Science"). Another palace known as al-Qasr al-Nafi'i was located to the south of the eastern palace on a site occupied today by the 19th-century Wikala al-Silahdar inside Khan al-Khalili. The Fatimids also built leisure palaces along the shores of the Nile and along the Khalij canal, such as the Lu'lu'a or Pearl Palace built by al-'Aziz and rebuilt by al-Zahir. (It was later used as the residence for Salah ad-Din's father.) The mother of al-'Aziz also built a large palace within al-Qarafa, the vast necropolis and cemetery of the main city of Fustat to the south.

== The palaces after the Fatimids ==
Cairo was definitively opened to all people under the rule of Salah ad-Din (Saladin), who dismantled the Fatimid Caliphate in 1171 and embarked on the construction of a new fortified citadel (the current Citadel of Cairo) further south, outside the walled city, that would house Egypt's rulers and state administration. This ended Cairo's status as an exclusive palace-city and started a process by which the city became an economic center inhabited by ordinary Egyptians and frequented by foreign travelers. The old Fatimid palaces in the city became obsolete as caliphal residences and were opened up to redevelopment. Salah ad-Din initially transformed them into residences for the aristocracy of his own Ayyubid dynasty, as well as into madrasas, a khanqah, and a hospital. The Ayyubid sultans al-Kamil and al-Salih built important madrasas in different areas of the site of the former palaces. In the Mamluk period the transformation of the area continued and most of the palaces disappeared and were replaced with various urban structures, and transformed into new city neighbourhoods. Some remnants of the palace remained standing for centuries after the fall of the Fatimids.

Nonetheless, the main north–south street of Cairo, the Qasaba (al-Muizz Street), remained a fixture and the former area of Bayn al-Qasrayn remained a privileged site for the construction of royal architectural complexes such as the Maristan-Mausoleum-Madrasa complex of Sultan Qalawun. The Bayn al-Qasrayn square itself, however, steadily disappeared and became essentially another stretch of the Qasaba street, as construction on either side filled up the previously open space.

== Remnants of the palaces today ==
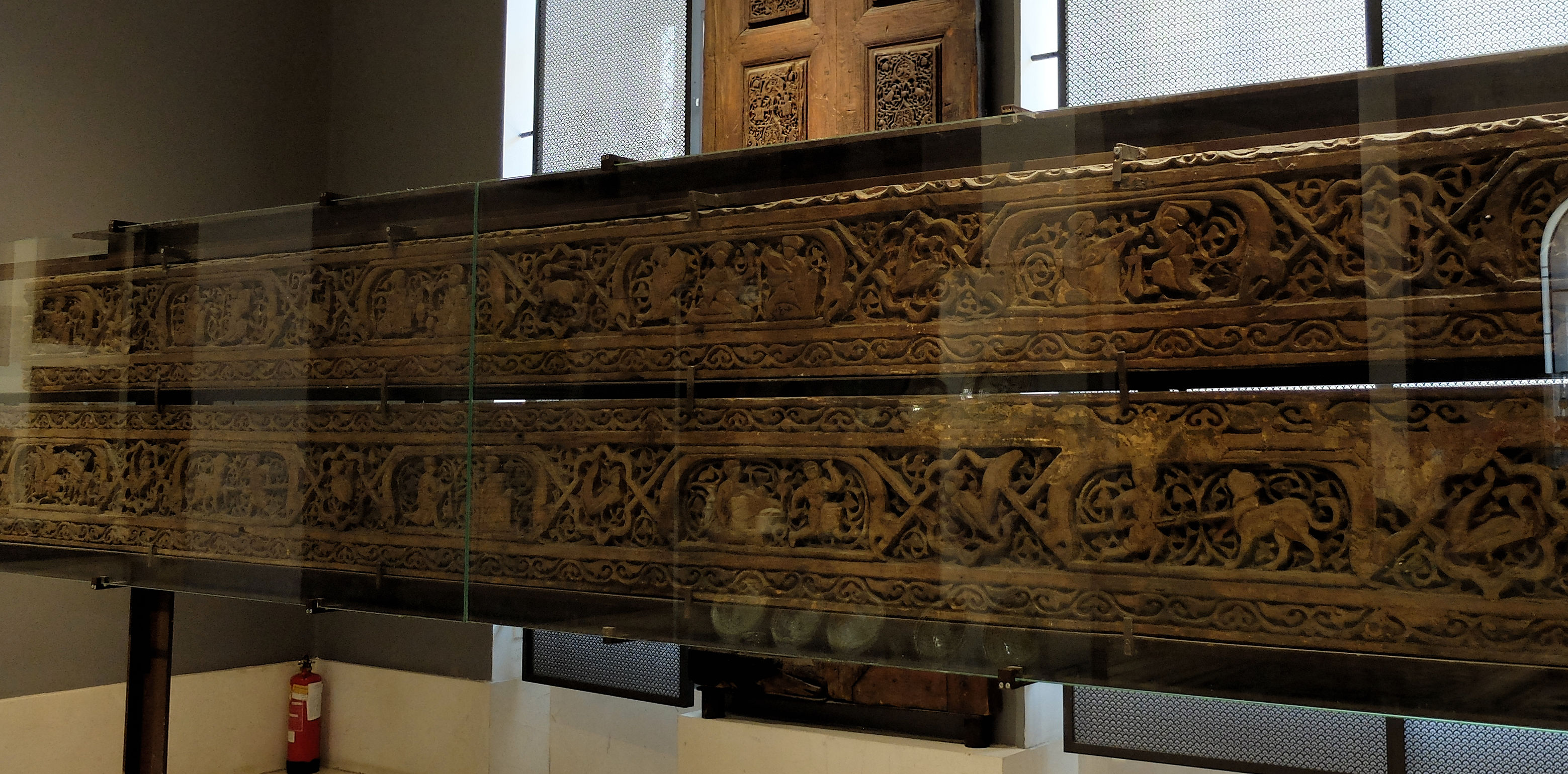
A pair of wooden beams carved with scenes of animals and humans which belonged to the Fatimid Western Palace. (On display at the Museum of Islamic Art, Cairo.)

Practically nothing remains of the palaces today, other than the occasional toponym and a few minor physical fragments. Most of the buildings in the Bayn al-Qasrayn area were built on top of the foundations or ruins of the palaces. One of the main courtyards in the maristan (hospital) of Sultan al-Mansur Qalawun (built in 1285) incorporates remnants of the Western Fatimid Palace, in particular some carved stucco windows in its eastern iwan, probably part of what was originally a palace courtyard which had four iwans arranged in a cross formation. Likewise, the lobed fountain in the middle of the courtyard of Qalawun's madrasa (in the same complex) also belonged to that palace. The 13th-century Madrasa of al-Salih Ayyub was built in part over the former kitchens of the palace. The Khanqah of Sultan Baybars al-Jashnakir (built in 1306–1310) and the Madrasa of Amir Qarasunqur (built in 1300) stand on the site of the former residence of the Fatimid viziers, which faced a western gate of the Eastern Palace. The large iron window grille in the exterior facade of the mausoleum of Baybars al-Jashnakir's khanqah was originally an artifact brought from the Abbasid palaces in Baghdad and used in the Fatimid viziers' palace. The old Ayyubid minaret at the entrance of the al-Hussein Mosque is built over one of the Fatimid Eastern Palace's former gates (cited as the "Bab al-Akhdar" but perhaps the same as the Bab al-Daylam) as the shrine of al-Hussein was originally adjoined to the palace.

Some artifacts and architectural fragments from the Fatimid Great Palaces are now on display in Cairo's Museum of Islamic Art, including wooden panels and beams found in the Maristan complex of Qalawun and in the Madrasa of al-Nasir Muhammad.

== See also ==
- Fatimid architecture
- Fatimid Caliphate
- Bayn al-Qasrayn
- al-Aqmar Mosque
- Abbasid palaces in Baghdad

== Bibliography ==
- Sayyid, Ayman Fuʾād (1998). La capitale de l'Égypte jusqu'à l'époque fatimide. Al-Qāhira et al-Fusṭāṭ: Essai de reconstitution topographique. Beiruter Texte und Studien (in French). Stuttgart: Franz Steiner Verlag. ISBN 3-515-05716-1.
