= Qalawun complex =

Pious complex in Cairo, Egypt

- مجمع قلاوون
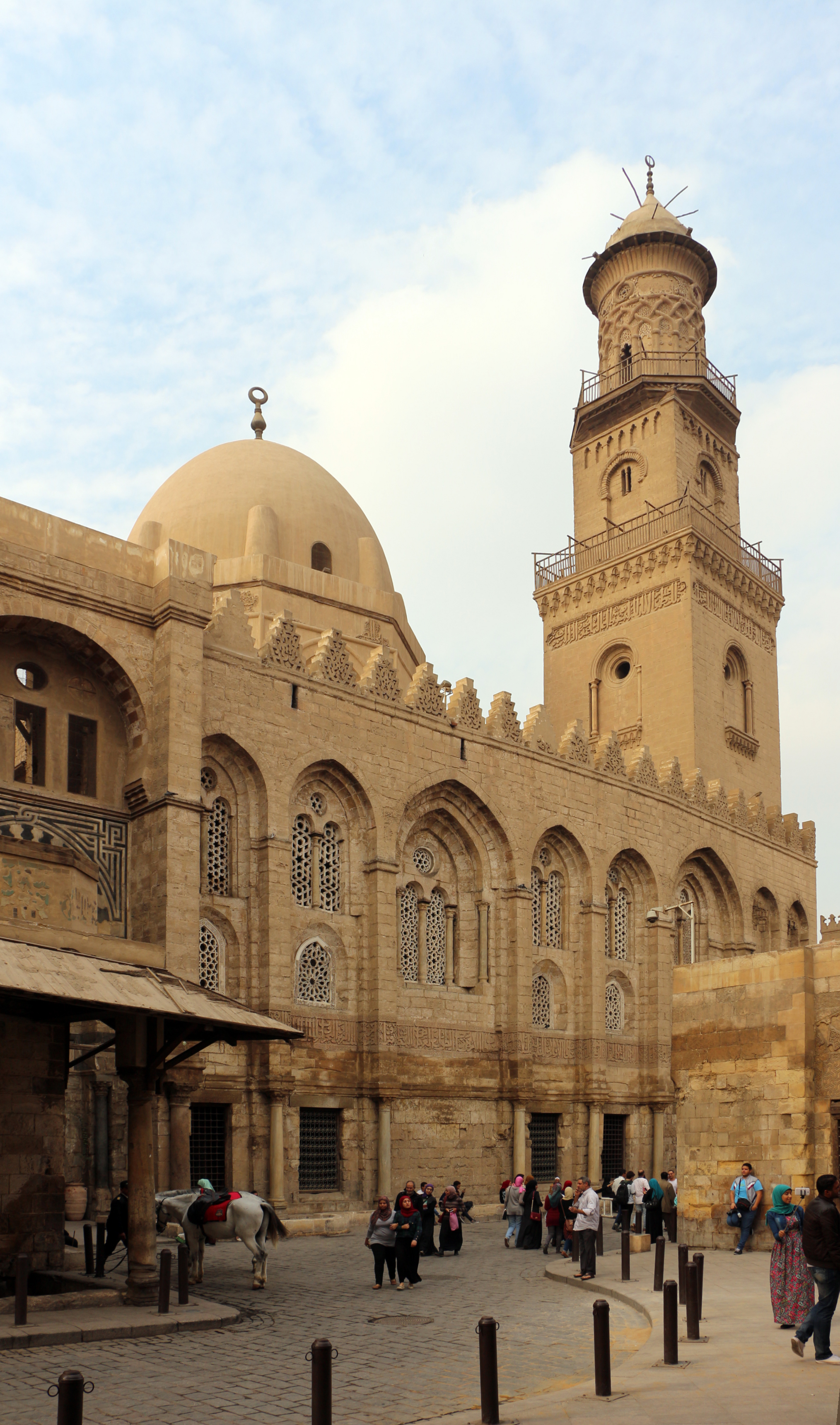
- Qalawun complex, viewed from al-Mu'izz Street

Religion
- Affiliation: Islam
- Status: inactive

Location
- Location: Bayn al-Qasrayn, al-Mu'izz Street, Islamic Cairo
- Country: Egypt
- Interactive map of Qalawun complex
- Coordinates: 30°02′58″N 31°15′39″E

Architecture
- Type: Madrasa; Mausoleum; Bimaristan
- Style: Mamluk
- Founder: Sultan al-Mansur Qalawun
- Completed: 1285

Specifications
- Dome: 1
- Minaret: 1
- Materials: Stone, brick, marble, stucco

The Qalawun complex (Arabic: مجمع قلاوون), also known as the Funerary complex of Sultan al-Mansur Qalawun, is a historic religious complex located at Bayn al-Qasrayn on al-Mu'izz street, in Islamic Cairo, Egypt. Built by Sultan al-Mansur Qalawun between 1284 and 1285, the complex is like many other pious complexes and includes a hospital (bimaristan), a madrasa, mausoleum, and mosque.

Despite controversy surrounding its construction, the complex is widely regarded as one of the major monuments of Islamic Cairo and of Mamluk architecture, notable for the size and scope of its contributions to legal scholarship, its charitable operations, and for the richness of its architecture.

== History ==
=== Historical context and background ===
The Qalawun complex was built over the ruins of the Fatimid Western Palace, with several halls in the palace. Unlike most later Mamluk sultans, Qalawun did not begin construction on his funerary complex right after coming to power but did so many years later, after he consolidated his rule and fought off the Mongols in Syria. The structure is situated in the heart of Cairo, on the prestigious Bayn al-Qasrayn street, and has been a center for important Islamic religious and court ceremonies and rituals for centuries, stretching from the Mamluk dynasty through the Ottoman Empire.

This complex is one of many Mamluk buildings that made Cairo a flourishing metropolis in the 13th through 16th centuries. It is one of many pious complexes (fully-integrated multifunctional complexes often centered around the tomb of religious figures or patrons that included turbas or funerary complexes, khanqahs, and other buildings) that served many purposes including exalting the patron through displays of their wealth, piety, and legitimacy.

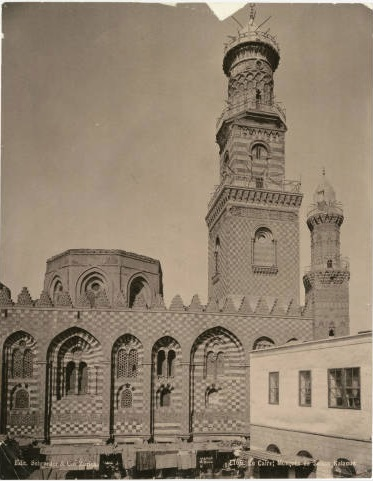
Facade of Sultan Qalawun's complex on al-Muizz Street

=== Construction and controversy ===
The funerary complex of Sultan al-Mansur Sayf al-Din Qalawun, including both madrasa and mausoleum reportedly took 13 months to build, and was under construction from 1284 to August 1285. This fact is remarkable considering the size and scope of the complex. The hospital took less than six months to complete, the mausoleum and madrasa each taking about four months. The building project was supervised by emir ‘Alam al-Din Sanjar al-Shuja‘i al-Mansuri (عَلَمُ الدِّينِ سَنْجَرُ الشُّجَاعِيُّ المَنْصُورِيُّ, romanised: ʿAlam ad-Dīn Sanǧar aš-Šuǧāʿī al-Manṣūrī), whose speedy completion of this massive project through illicit methods resulted in controversy and enduring negative associations with the monument. In al-Maqrīzī's history of Cairo's monuments, he reports that construction of the complex was completed by the forced labor of builders, passers-by in the area, and Mongol prisoners of war, all of which reportedly were subject to "brutal abuse." In addition to employing brutal labor practices, Sanjar also illegally acquired properties and forcibly evicted their inhabitants to complete the complex. The means by which this complex was built even caused some religious scholars to call for the boycotting of such complexes. Despite the controversy surrounding its construction, after its completion, the complex was considered one of the most beautiful buildings at that time, where it included a school (madrasa), a hospital (bimaristan) and a mausoleum, with an intricate dome. Historians claim that the columns holding the mausoleum structure were made of granite, marble, and other materials that were taken from al-Salih's (Qalawun's master) palace and citadel in Roda Island. The complex was built in three stages, where the hospital was finished first, the Mausoleum and then finally the school.

=== Restorations ===
Following an earthquake in 1302 that destroyed many structures in Cairo, al-Nasir Muhammad, the son and successor of Qalawun, rebuilt the complex and its minaret in a campaign to restore the damaged mosques. Another restoration came when Abdul-Rahman Katkhuda, created an Ottoman Sabil on the other side of the street in 1776.

=== 19th century ===
Architect Pascal Coste used the complex as one of his sources for his book Architecture arabe: ou Monuments du Kaire, mesurés et dessinés, de 1818 à 1825. Coste worked at the complex from July 1817 as an infrastructure expert hired by Muhammad Ali. As identified by Eva-Maria Troelenberg, Coste's drawings sought to adjust and define the angles of the structure to reimagine the building as a modernized urban space.

== Description ==
=== Overview ===
The complex consists of a tomb, madrasa, mosque, and a hospital, arranged on either side of a long, central corridor. Upon entering through a slight, horseshoe-arched portal, the cruciform madrasa is to the left with four iwans arranged around an open court with a pool in the center. The long passage that follows supports the minaret above and is covered in a wooden ceiling, making the monument's lighting rather dark. The mausoleum, which houses the bodies of Sultan Qalawun and his son, al-Nasir, stands on the street side of the complex between the entrance passage and the subsequent adjacent madrasa of Sultan Barquq. The qibla wall of both the mausoleum and the prayer iwan are both next to the street. The hospital is not visible from the alley since it is located at the rear of the long passage.

==== Exterior ====
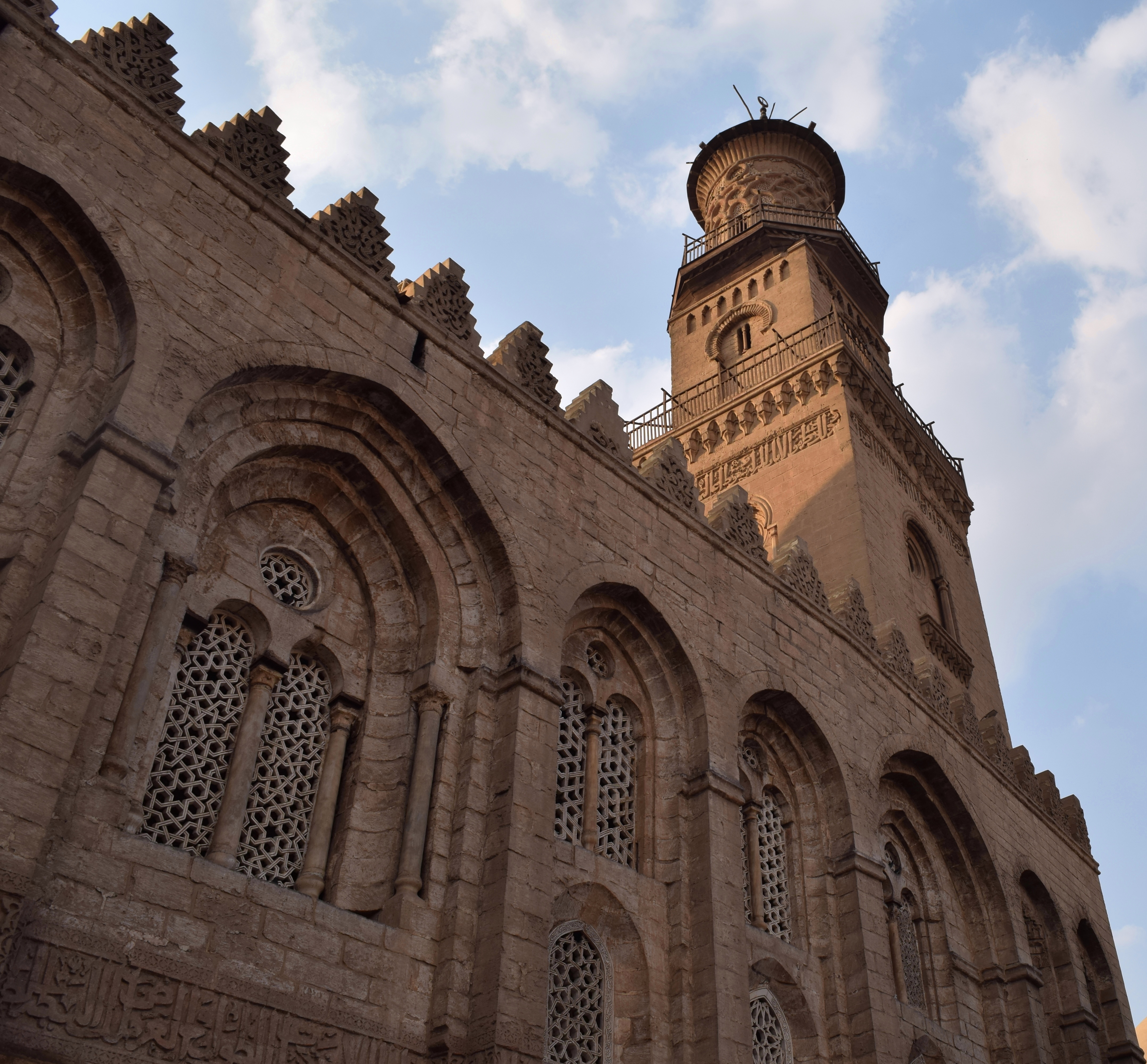
View of minaret and grilled windows from the façade

The exterior structure of the Qalawun complex has many unique firsts in Mamluk architecture. The prayer hall of the madrasa projects into the street, asserting the prominence of the complex. The madrasa's three-story minaret, uniquely placed near the entrance of the building, has a papyrus cornice that harkens back to rule of the Pharaohs, serving to legitimize Mamluk rule. The 67-meter long façade of the complex displays similarities to Gothic or Crusader styles. The façade was constructed using ashlar blocks and consists of varying sizes of pointed-arched panels that come together to enclose single windows. The building's entrance portal consists of a rounded arch that encloses a pointed arch with ablaq-striped voussoirs, spandrels with geometric motifs, and a grilled double window with an oculus. The oculus and coupled window are elements echoed in the mausoleum's entrance portal, which is decorated with masterful stucco. The windows of this complex are open and grilled which allows prayers and Quranic recitations to be heard from the building throughout the day. The façades of the madrasa and mausoleum are further connected by a gilded inscription of the complex's founder and important dates in the building's inauguration and completion.

==== Interior ====
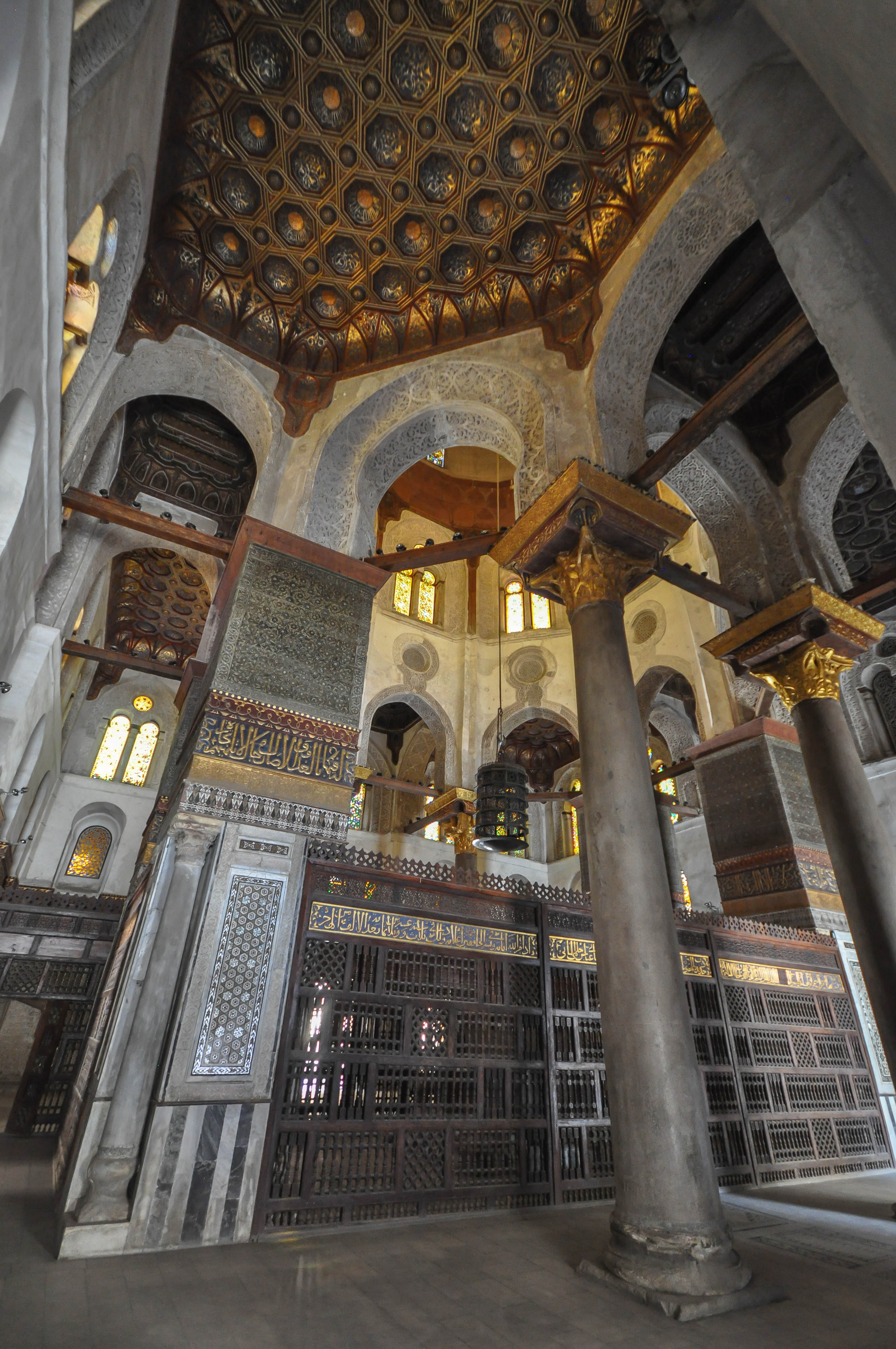
Carved stucco, marble mosaic, and gilded wooden coffers in the Qalawun complex's interior.

The mausoleum and madrasa are across each other in a corridor while the hospital is situated at the end of this corridor, which leads to a rectangular court. Several iwans exist within the complex in this courtyard and in the hospital's courtyard. The walls of the interior are decorated with marble mosaic and carved stucco while the ceilings are decorated with painted and gilded wooden coffers. The floors are decorated with opus sectile, and the finely adorned mihrab is decorated with glass mosaic.

=== The mausoleum ===
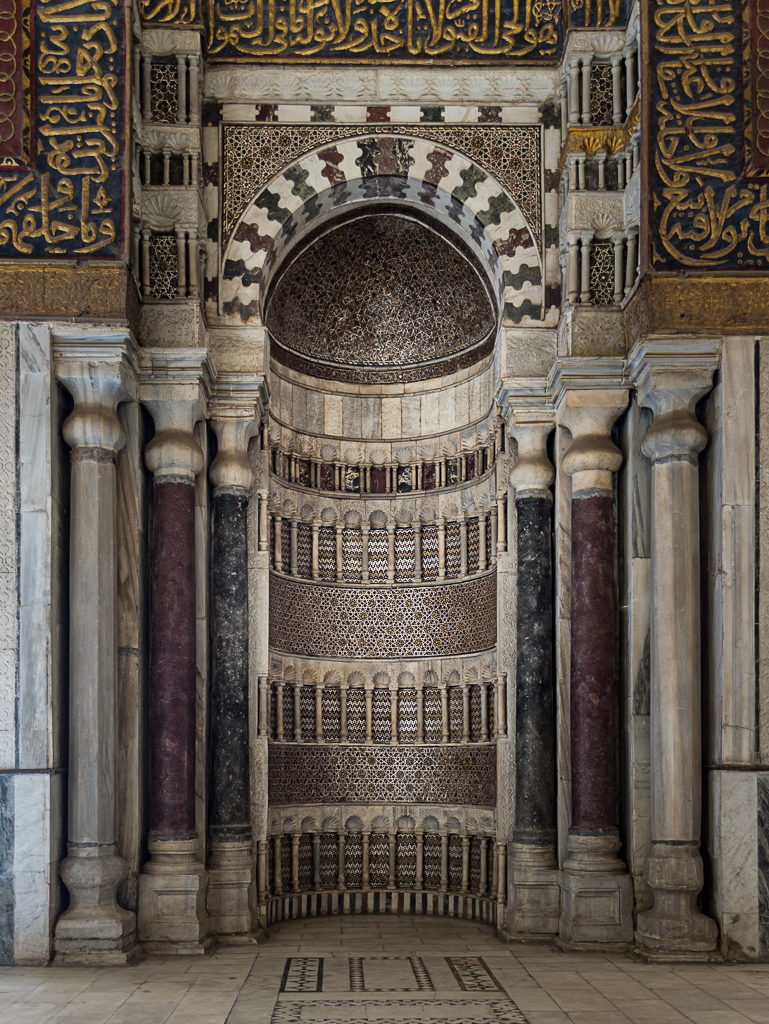
Mihrab of Qalawun's mausoleum.

The mausoleum houses the bodies of Sultan Qalawun and his son, al-Nasir Mohammed. The mausoleum consists of a great rectangle that includes four piers and four columns, arranged so as to form an octagon on which rests a high drum surmounted by a dome. The axis of the mausoleum corresponds with the wide bay nearest the entrance which frames one window only and the lower part corresponds with the back of the mihrab. The columns have Corinthian capitals and above them runs a continuous ogee molding. A meter above the columns is a band of inscriptions dating when EmĪr Gamāl ad-Dīn Aqqūsh was named director of the hospital. Each pier on the southwestern side of the mausoleum is decorated to match the pier opposite of itself. Above the columns capitals runs a frieze, divided into two bands. The lower band is decorated with vine scrolls, composed of large pentagonal leaves. The upper band consists of a Naskhi inscription in large raised letters made of stucco. The mihrab of the mausoleum is often considered as the most lavish of its kind. This is in contrast to the mihrab of the madrasa, which is less grand in size and general aesthetics. The mihrab's horseshoe profile is flanked by the three columns made of marble.

The Mausoleum of Qalawun is significant because its dome served as a ceremonial center for the investing of new emirs. The dome became a symbol of new power, a changing of the guard, thus signifying a new center of Mamluk power, which enjoyed great prosperity from the 13th to 16th centuries. The mausoleum's dome was demolished by the Ottoman Governor over Egypt Abdul-Rahman Katkhuda and was then rebuilt in Ottoman architecture. However, the committee for reservation of Arab monuments built another dome to replace Abdul-Rahman Katkhuda's dome in 1908.

=== The madrasa ===
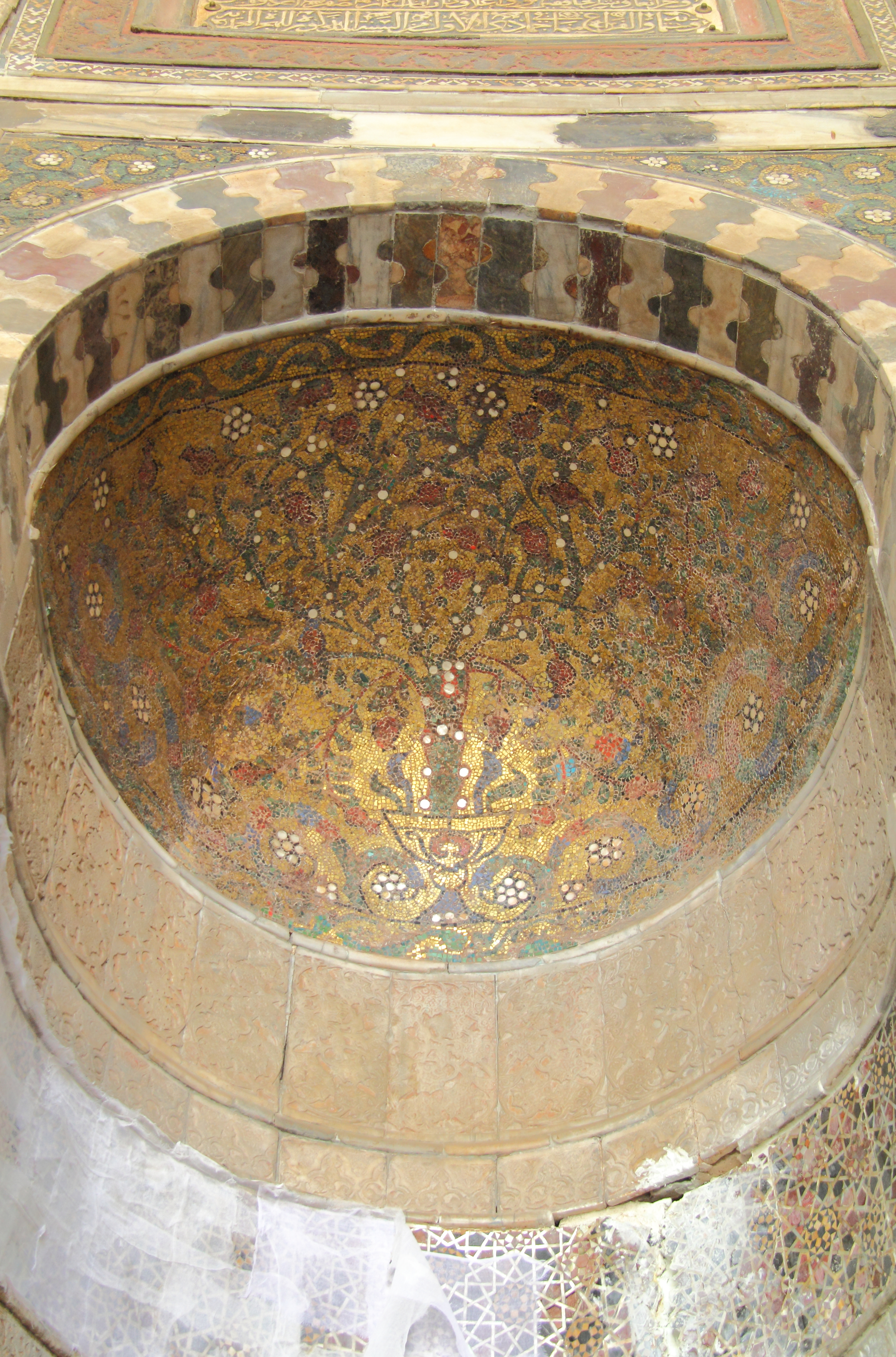
Madrasa mihrab with naturalistic, glass and mother-of-pearl mosaic.

Within the madrasa the four legal schools, or the four madhhabs of Islamic law were regularly taught. Other teachings housed in the madrasa included the Hadith and the teaching of medicine. The madrasa had two iwans and two recesses as evidenced by the accompanying waqf document. On the east side of the madrasa are three stories of student cells, the upper stories are available through a staircase. The large courtyard of the madrasa was paved with polychrome marble.

The madrasa façade includes a continuation of the red and gold inscription found on the façade of the mausoleum. There are two tall, pointed-arch panels on each side and three smaller central arches that contain two tiers of windows. The façade of the madrasa that leads to the courtyard contains a central arch divided into two stories of three consecutive arches, of which the central arch was the largest. Though three oculi originally existed on the façade, only one remains today. This entire arch structure is accompanied by three stories of smaller arches on each side.

The mihrab of the madrasa has a horse-shoe arch similar to the mausoleum but is smaller and less elaborate than that of the mausoleum and its conch is marked with glass mosaics and mother-of-pearl, rather than marble mosaics. The deep red color used in the mosaics stands out. The mosaic contains a naturalistic and scrolling decoration unlike the mihrab of the mausoleum which features geometric mosaic. The use of glass mosaics points to the Umayyad tradition as seen in the Dome of the Rock; the revival of this medium during this period in Cairo serves to legitimize the Mamluk sultan's rule within an Islamic history.

=== The hospital ===
Though not visible from the street the hospital once stood as the most lavish and impressive hospital of its time. The hospital functioned for over 500 years, and was treating patients through the late Ottoman period before it was demolished in 1910. The hospital offered many amenities to the sick and poor in addition to medical treatment, including drugs, shelter, food, and clothing. Information about production of drugs for medical treatment, research, and teaching that occurred within the hospital have been gleaned from a waqf documents from the time. The Medieval Islamic historian al-Maqrizi has his own observations regarding the history of the hospital. According to Maqrizi, Sultan Qalā'ūn received inspiration to build the hospital as a result of a vow which he had taken when he was ill in the Bimaristan of Nur ad-Din in Damascus, after which vowed to copy it. The original entrance was a L-shaped corridor which divided the mausoleum from the madrasa which measured approximately 21 by 33 metres (69 by 108 ft). Drawings by Pascal Coste between 1815 and 1825 show that the building was planned on two axes at right angles to each other. Four iwans were located in the hospital. Between the four iwans were rooms, some of which were sick wards, latrines, store rooms, and mortuaries. The largest iwan was decorated with a band of stucco ornament similar to those of the mosque of Baybars and mausoleum of Mustafā Pasha.

== See also ==
- Islam in Egypt
- List of hospitals in Cairo
- List of madrasas in Egypt
- List of mausoleums in Cairo
- List of mosques in Cairo
- List of mosques in Egypt
- High medieval domes
