= Sabil =

Sabil may refer to:

== Places ==
- Sabil, Iran
- Sabil, Saudi Arabia

== Public fountains ==
- Sabil (fountain) or sabil, a public water fountain in Islamic countries
- Sabil-Kuttab of Abd al-Rahman Katkhuda, Cairo
- Sabil-Kuttab of Qaytbay, Cairo
- Sabil Abu Nabbut, roadside fountain in Jaffa, Israel
- Sebilj in Sarajevo, public fountain
