= Sabil (fountain) =

Public fountain in Islamic architecture

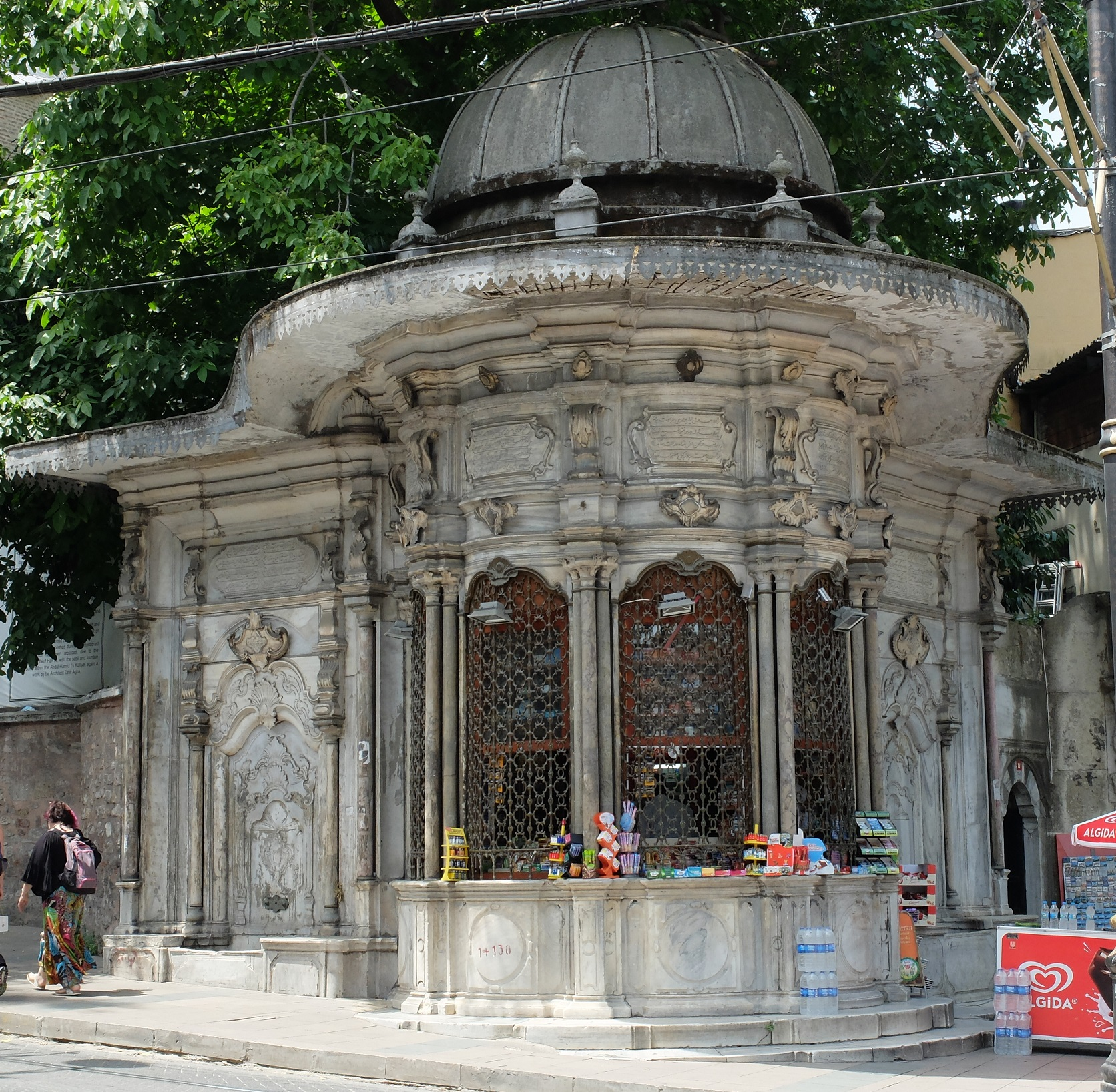
The sebil-fountain of Abdülhamid I, a historic sebil in Istanbul dating from 1777. It includes both an actual sebil (the curved kiosk with windows) and two wall fountains with taps (çesme in Turkish) on either side.

A sabil or sebil (Arabic: سبيل, romanized: sabīl; Turkish: sebil) is a small kiosk in the Islamic architectural tradition where water is freely dispensed to members of the public by an attendant behind a grilled window. The term is sometimes also used to refer to simple unmanned fountains with a tap for drinking water, though other names often exist for such fountains (such as çesme in Turkish).

Historically, sabils are structures of both civic and religious importance in Muslim cities, most prominently in the cities of the Ottoman Empire, based in Istanbul, and of the Mamluk Empire, based in Cairo. They were built at crossroads, in the middle of city squares, and on the outside of mosques and other religious complexes to provide drinking water for travelers and to assist ritual ablutions before prayer.

== Etymology ==
The word sabil comes from the Arabic verb root sabala (سبل) meaning "to let fall, drop, to let hang down, to close eyes or to shed tear". Sabil initially meant "road" or "path" and is used both metaphorically and literally in multiple instances in the Qur'an. Its use as an architectural term for a public water building or fountain likely derives from a more abstract meaning it acquired to refer to general acts or provisions done for the sake of God (such as a charitable act).

== Description and function ==
A typical sabil was built over an underground cistern which supplied the water for distribution. In some cases, the water drawn from the cistern then ran down a decorative carved marble panel called a salsabil, which may also have served the purpose of aerating the water as it came from the cistern. An attendant collected the water and distributed it to passers-by outside the sabil, usually through a window with a metal grille.

This service was free to members of the public, and was paid for by the revenues or funds of a charitable endowment, an Islamic waqf, provided or set up by the patron who commissioned the building. Endowing money for the construction of sabils was considered an act of piety, and the construction of many sabils was considered the hallmark of a beneficent ruler.

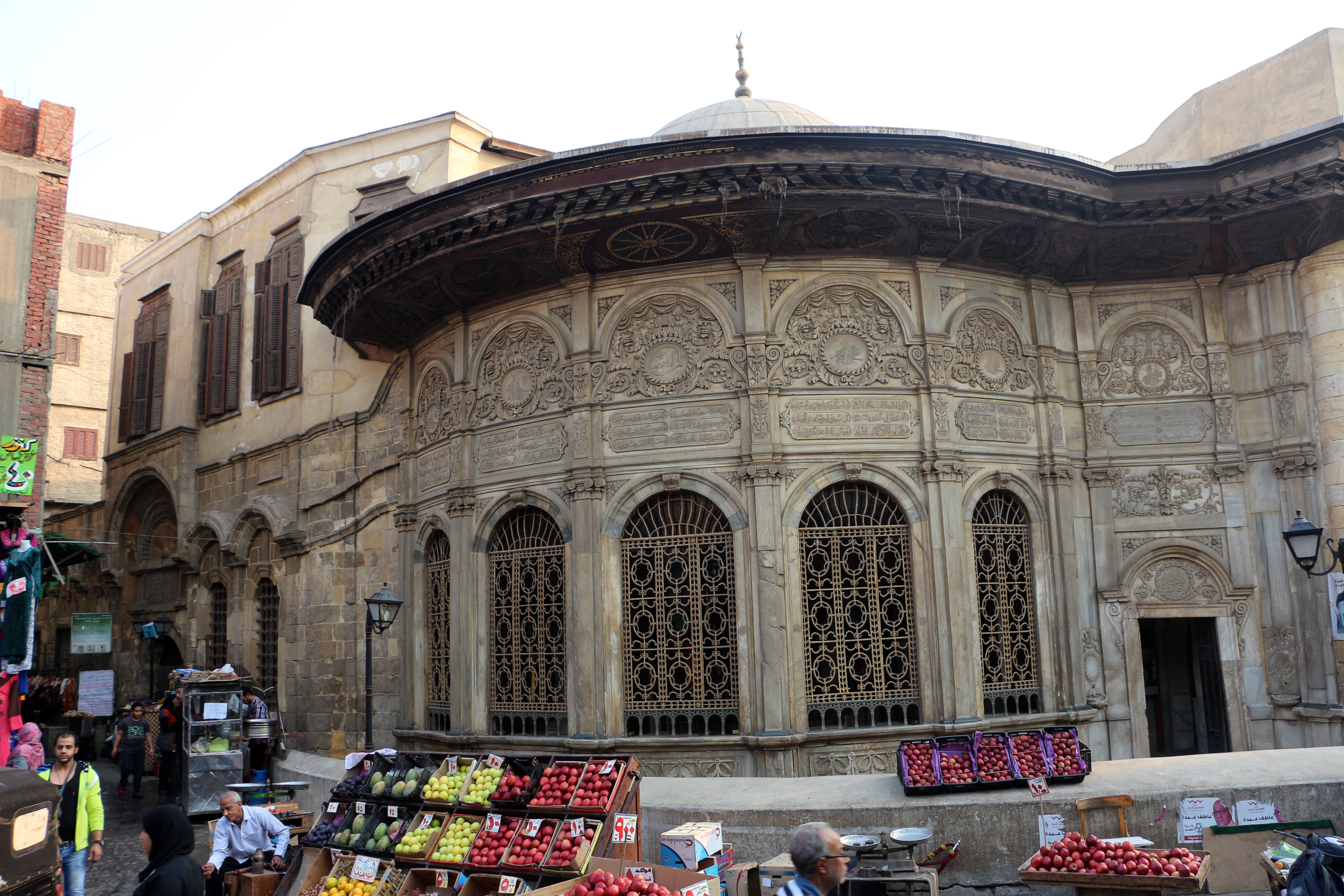
The street facade of the Sabil of Tusun Pasha (or Sabil of Muhammad Ali), Cairo, completed in 1820.

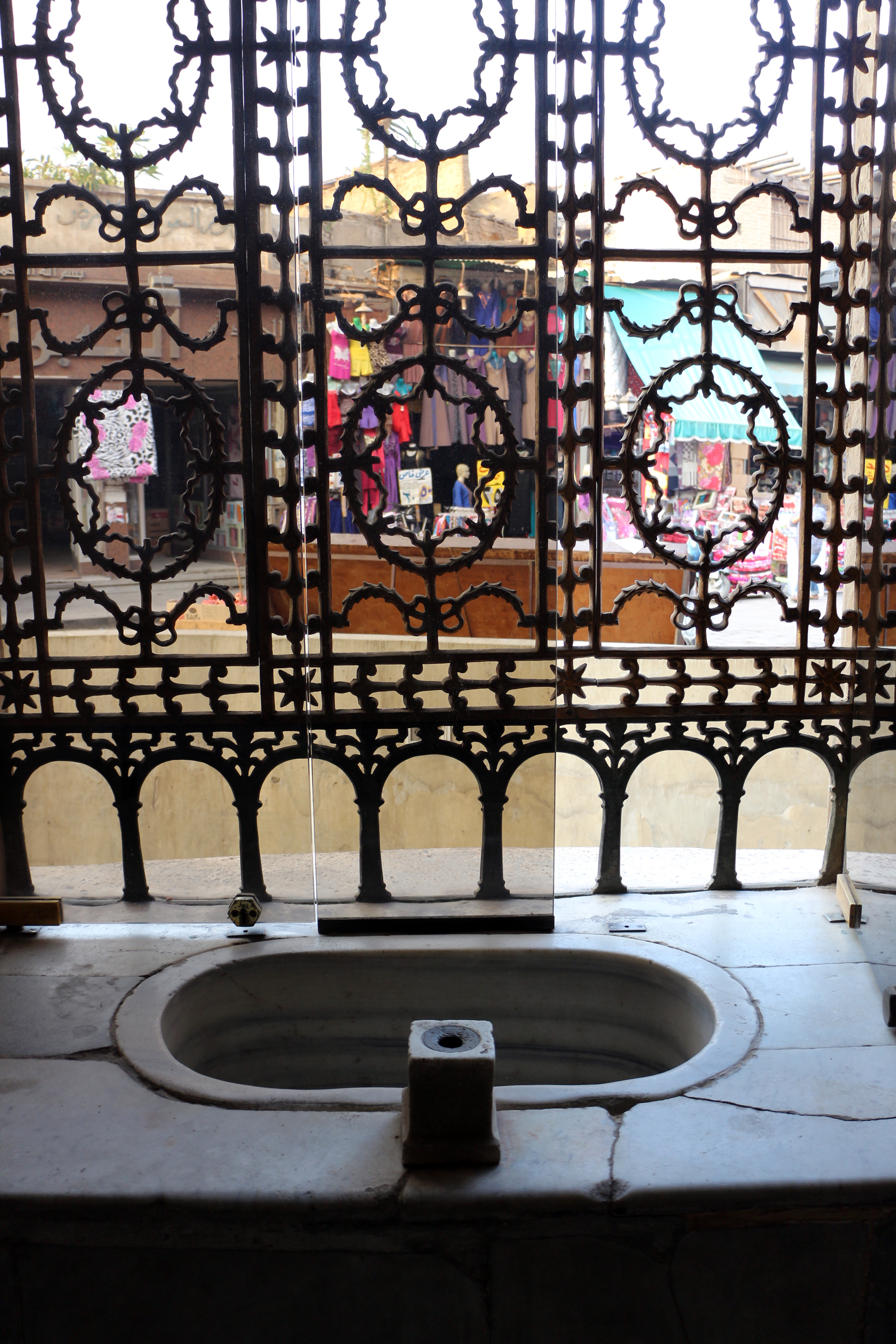
Water dispensing area inside the sabil. (Sabil of Tusun Pasha or Muhammad Ali, Cairo, 19th century.)

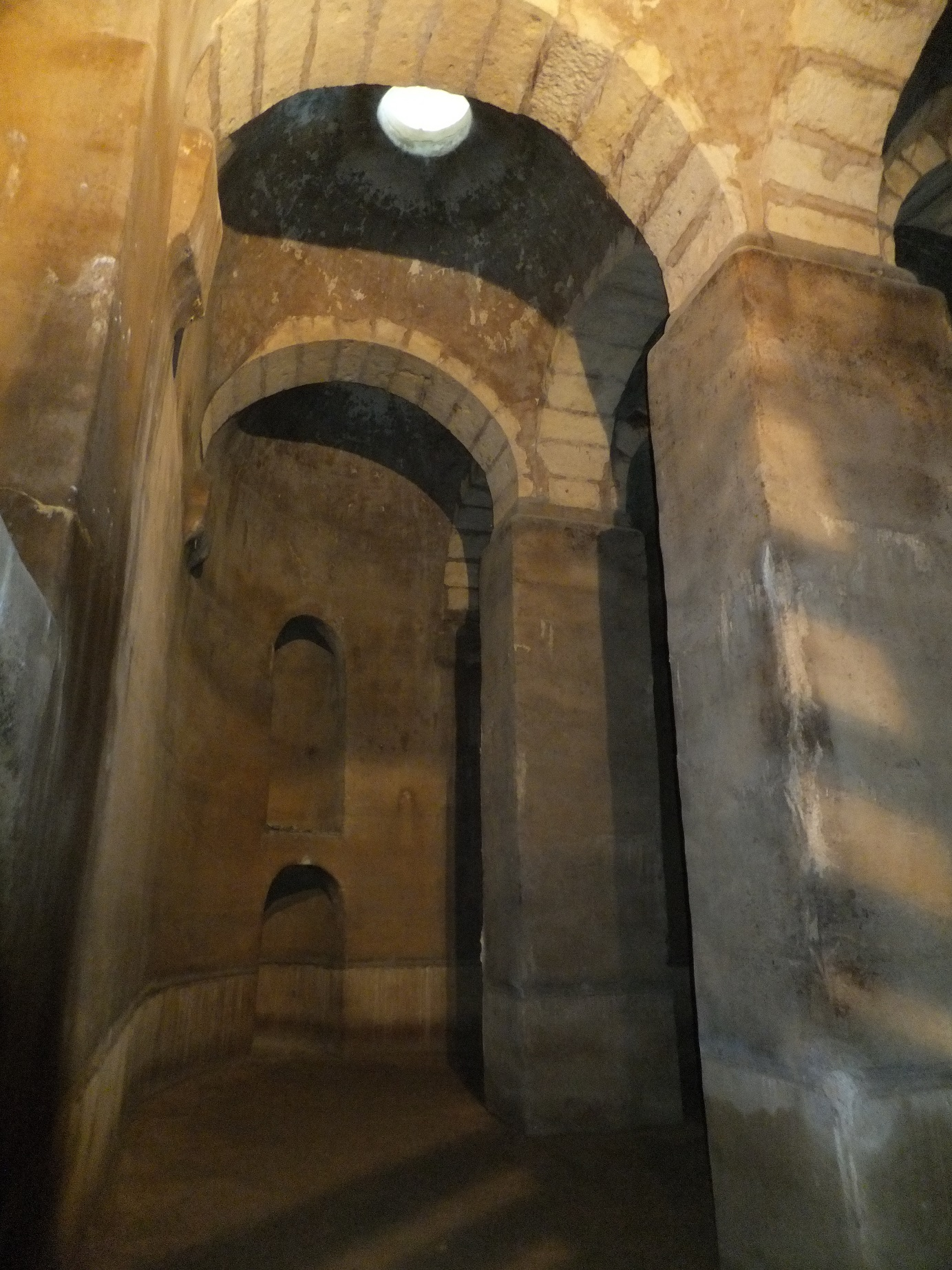
The underground water cistern for the sabil. (Sabil of Tusun Pasha or Muhammad Ali, Cairo, 19th century.)

== History ==
=== Origins in the Islamic world ===
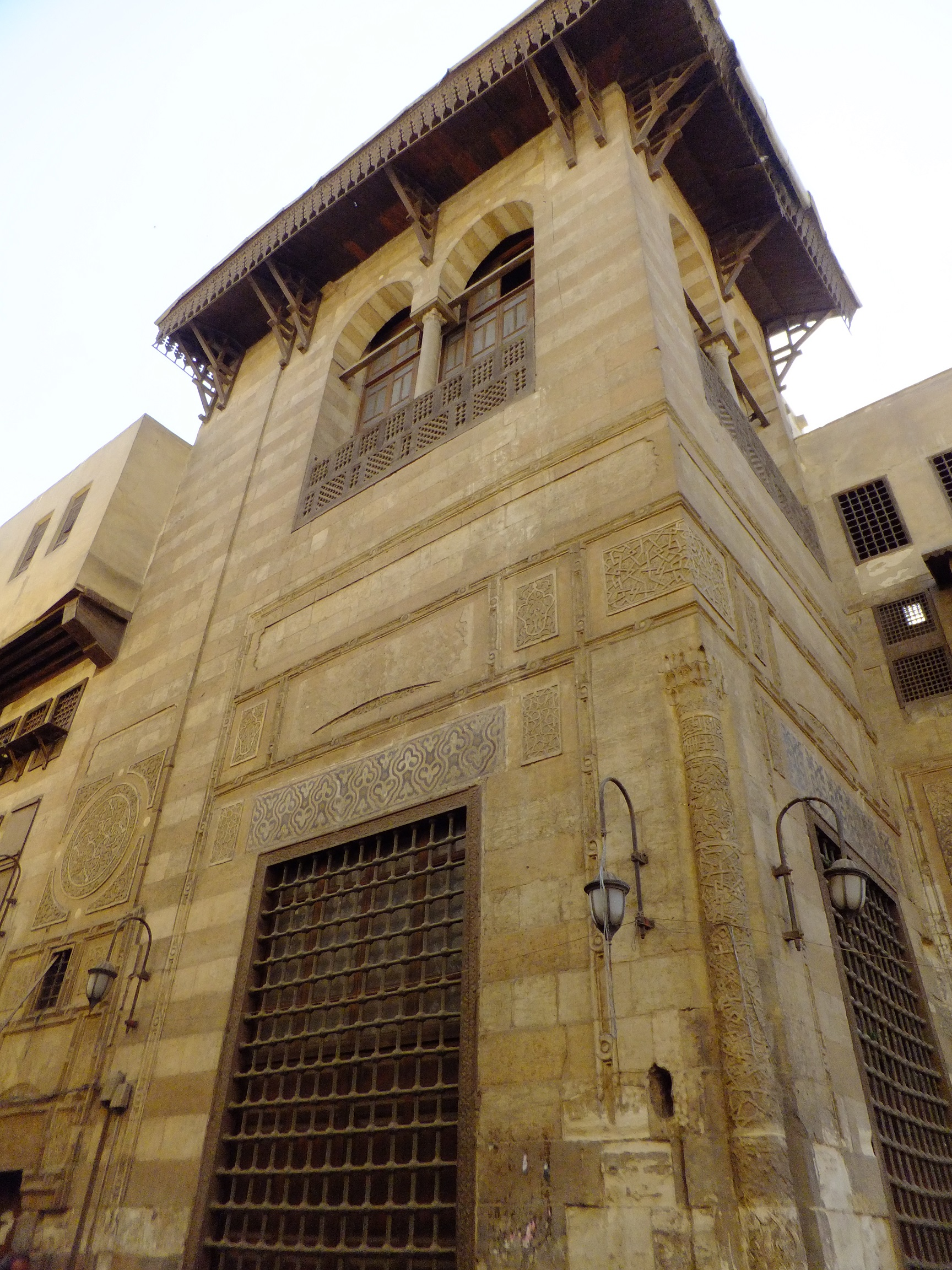
A typical Mamluk "sabil-kuttab" in Cairo, attached to the Wikala and Sabil-Kuttab of Sultan Qaytbay (near al-Azhar Mosque) and completed in 1477.

During the formative period of early Islamic society (seventh century onward), the Islamic world inherited the water traditions of the late antiquity Mediterranean world (formerly under Roman and Byzantine rule) and Iranian world (formerly under Sasanian rule). Islamic society developed existing methods into new ones or revived neglected ones. In addition to the regular water needs for drinking and for agriculture, water also had an important religions role in the ablutions or purification ritual required before prayer in Islam, such that even early mosques were equipped with either a water basin or fountain. Water also had other religious or spiritual symbolic importance, being associated with Paradise (heaven) and being used in the Qur'an as a symbol of Creation. The Qur'an describes water as a blessing from God (Allah), and some hadiths exhort Muslims to offer water to thirsty humans and animals.

As a result, water became an important element in Islamic architecture, both as a practical/religious provision as well as for aesthetic effects. Hammams (public bathhouses), inherited from the Roman thermae, continued to be an essential public facility in Islamic cities in addition to public fountains. At the same time, water was featured in palace and garden design as early as the Umayyad Caliphate (7th–8th centuries). It played a role in formal gardens (such as Persian gardens) and in palace architecture such as in the famous example of the Alhambra in Spain.

How the architectural format of the sabil itself first developed is debated. While water was implicated in architectural design across the Muslim world, the sabil as a recognizable structure with a particular purpose is associated mainly with the Mamluk Sultanate and with the Ottoman Empire, with both Istanbul and Cairo having numerous examples. Its architecture has been argued to draw inspiration from the descriptions of Paradise in the Qur'an.

=== Sabils in Mamluk Cairo ===
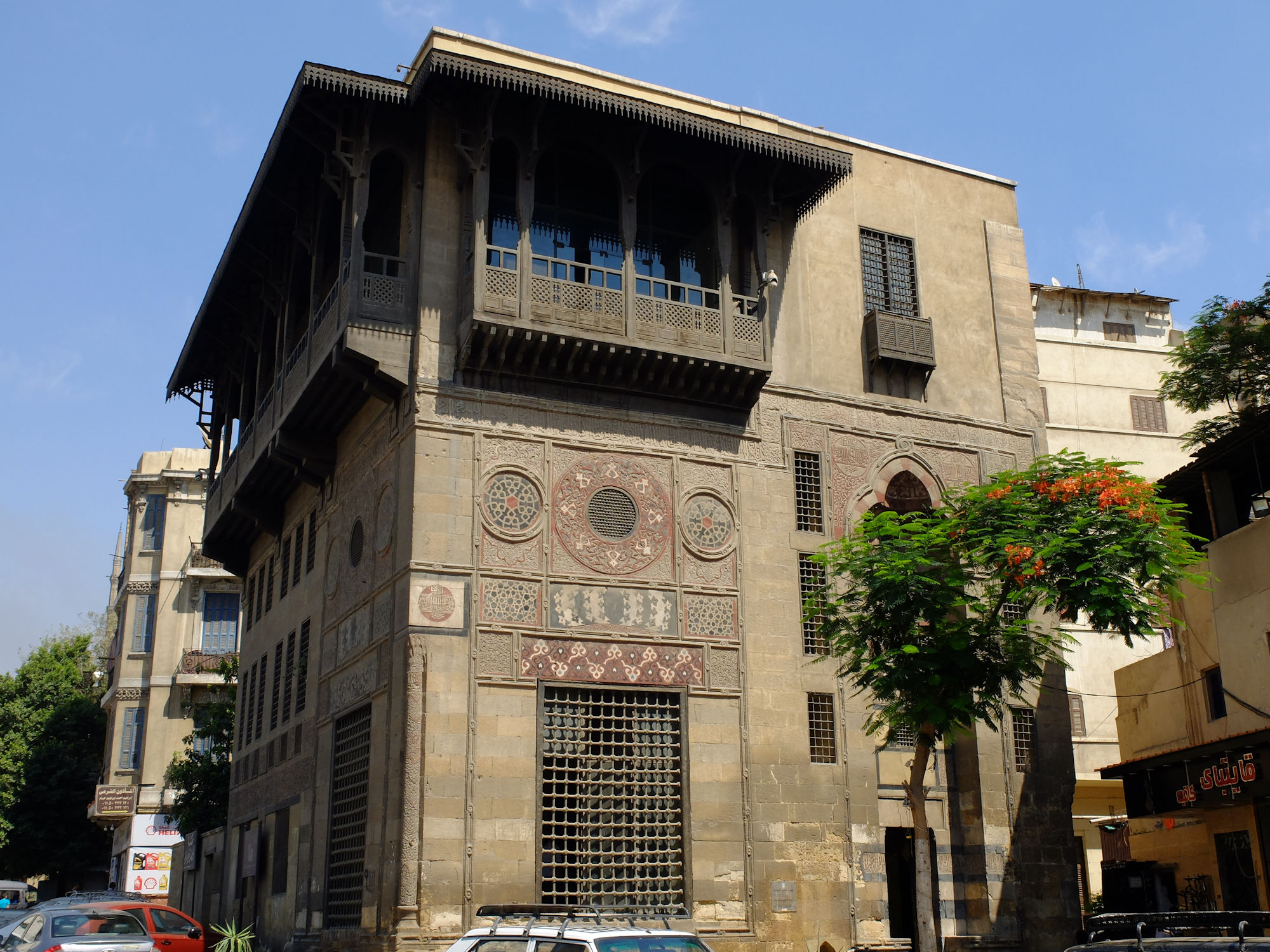
Sabil-Kuttab of Sultan Qaytbay in Cairo

The oldest sabil for which we have a date is in Damascus, Syria, and is dated to 1077–78 CE (570 AH) according to its inscription, which is well before Ayyubid or Mamluk rule in Egypt and Syria. The earliest (surviving) sabil in Cairo is the one installed by the Mamluk sultan al-Nasir Muhammad at the corner of his father's monumental hospital-madrasa-mausoleum complex during restorations in 1325–26. As Mamluk architecture developed, sabils became a standard feature of the religious and funerary complexes built by the Mamluk elites and also came to be typically accompanied by a kuttab (a space offering primary education, especially reading of the Qur'an). These "sabil-kuttab" structures were often located at the corner of the building complex along a busy road or at an intersection. The sabil was located at ground or street level (where it was accessible to passersby) while the kuttab was usually above it on the upper levels. Mamluk sabils had facades with large windows covered by heavy bronze grilles and their exteriors were well-decorated, typically with stone-carving along their surfaces and with multi-coloured marble panels above the windows. The interiors were also typically decorated with marble mosaics and with painted wooden ceilings, while the water from the cistern often trickled over an ornamental carved marble panel (known as a salsabil) before being collected by the sabil's attendant.

During the Mamluk period, such structures were almost always integrated into a larger building, and were rarely ever built as separate or stand-alone structures. The earliest free-standing or independent sabil-kuttab was the one built by Sultan Qaytbay in 1479 (the Sabil-Kuttab of Qaytbay) along Saliba Street. It was only under Ottoman rule (from 1517 onward) that independent sabil-kuttabs became a common building type in Cairo, with notable examples like the Sabil-kuttab of Abd al-Rahman Katkhuda at Bayn al-Qasrayn. This was in part because the Ottoman governors and elites of this period had relatively limited resources and Cairo itself had become densely built-up, leaving little space to build more. As such, the small but multi-level "sabil-kuttab" structure became a cost-effective option for political elites to offer charitable services to the general population, which in turn helped them publicly display their piety.

=== Sebils in Ottoman Istanbul ===
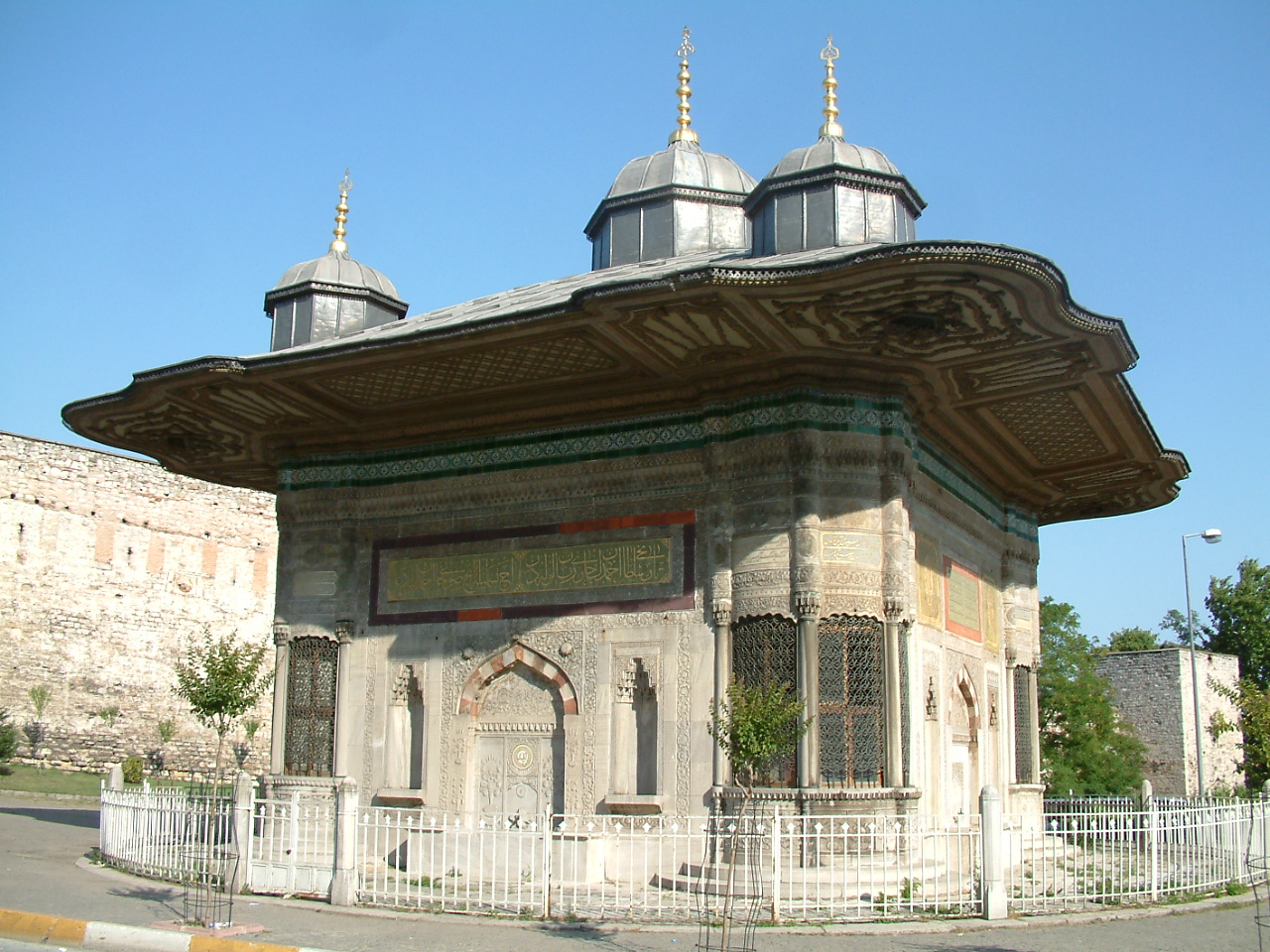
The Fountain and sebil of Sultan Ahmed III in Istanbul, built in 1728 in front of the Topkapı Palace gate.

In 16th century Istanbul, sebils (Note: Sebil is the Turkish rendition of sabil.) were a symbol of public possession. The attempt to add spigots (taps) was opposed because this was perceived as limiting public access to the blessings of nature. In later centuries, sebils became elaborately decorated structures, either attached to mosque complexes or existing as stand-alone structures, often at busy intersections or street corners. They were a prominent type of construction in the "Tulip period" during the reign of Ahmed III in the early 18th century, which saw an emergence of the "Rococo" Ottoman architectural style, and during the later "Baroque" phase of Ottoman architecture that followed. The Fountain of Ahmed III, next to Topkapı Palace and the Hagia Sophia, is one of the most famous and elaborate examples. Like other public monuments, they were often inscribed with Ottoman Turkish verses that formed a chronogram using the Abjad numbers to date the construction. Historically, during holidays and major celebrations, some sebils also distributed a sweetened fruit drink known as "sherbet" or another fruit juice.

Until the spread of in-house plumbing by the end of the 20th century, sebils and other fountains were essential for the daily life of the inhabitants of Istanbul. In present-day Istanbul, many sebils have either been abandoned or serve other functions such as commercial shops. Some have been restored as part of wider historical architectural complexes, but still do not serve their original purpose.

=== Contemporary forms of sabils ===
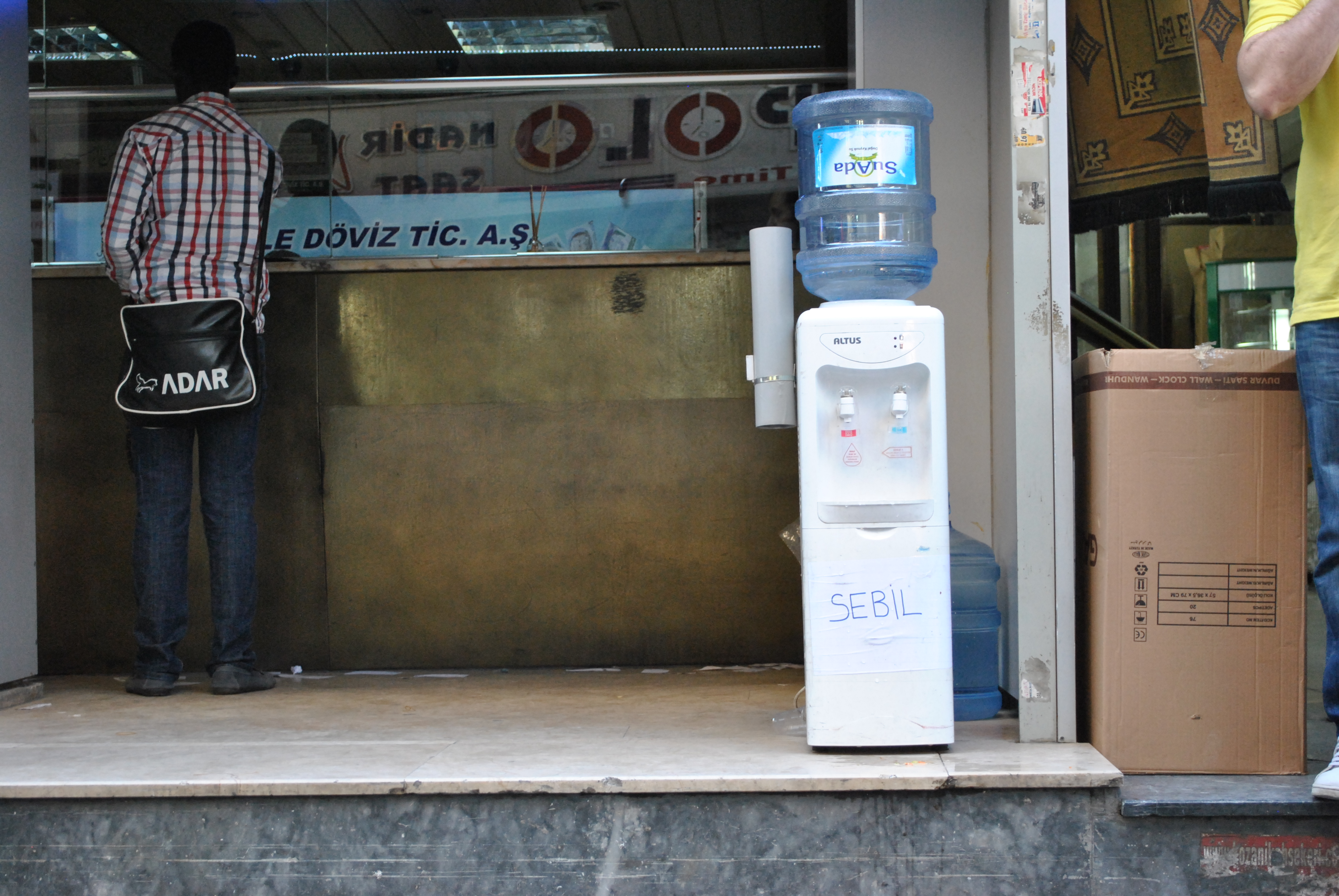
A water cooler set as a sabil at the entrance of a shop in Istanbul

Vernacular forms of charitable water fountains perpetuate the tradition of the sabils to the present day, offering water to passers-by in an act of piety. In Egypt, four main types can be found: olla, zeer, coleman and coldaire. These vernacular sabils can also be found in other countries, such as Sudan, Turkey and Iran.

== Examples ==
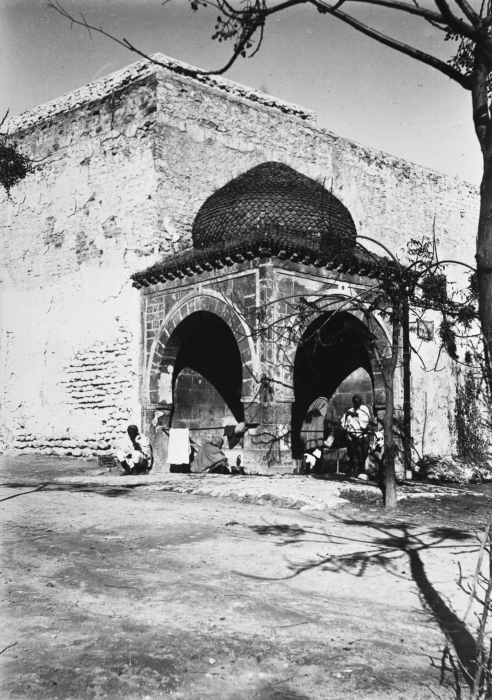
Hafsid-era fountain or sabil near Bab Sidi Abdessalem, Tunis

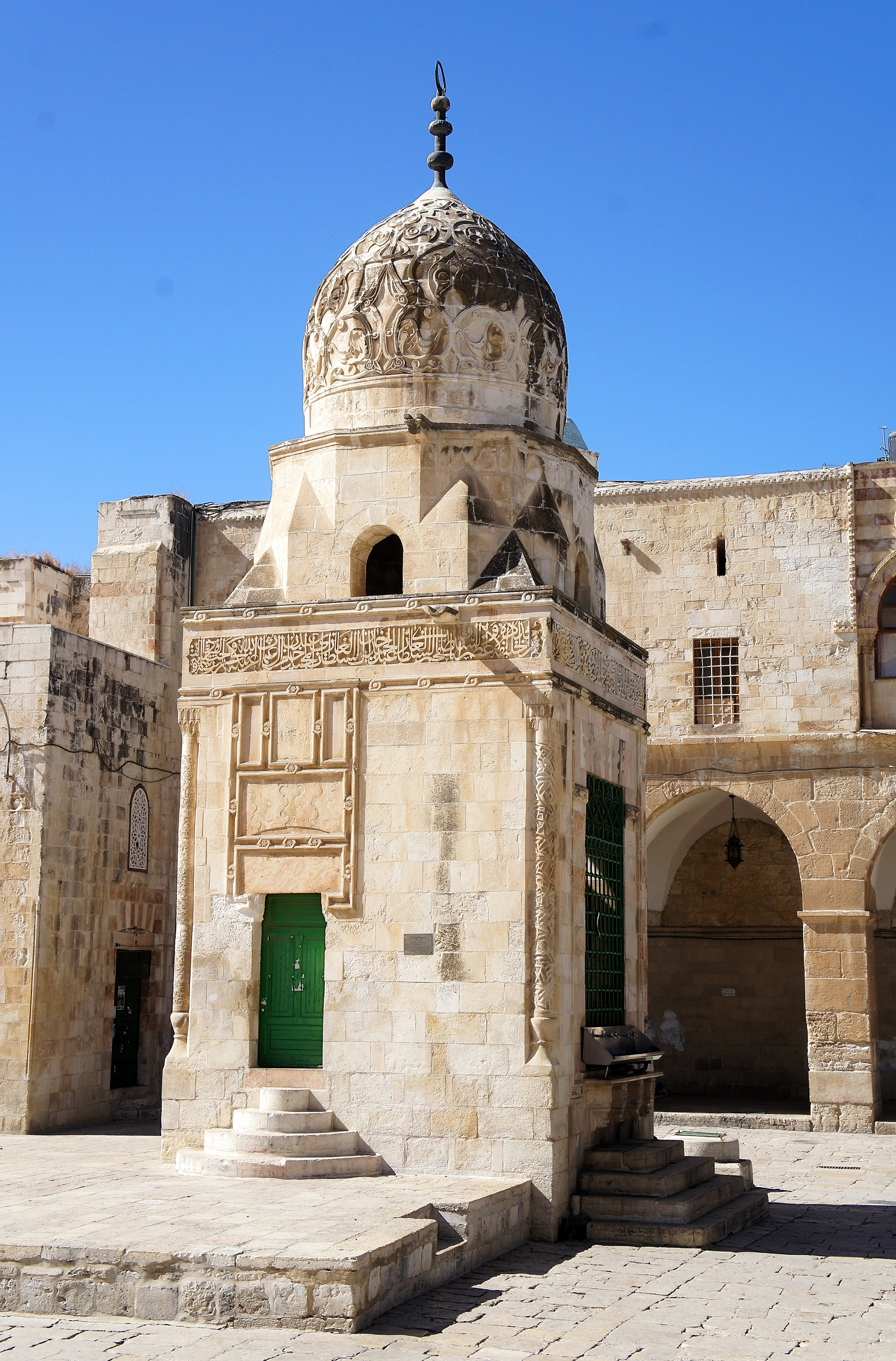
Fountain of Qayt Bay at the Temple Mount, Jerusalem (1482)

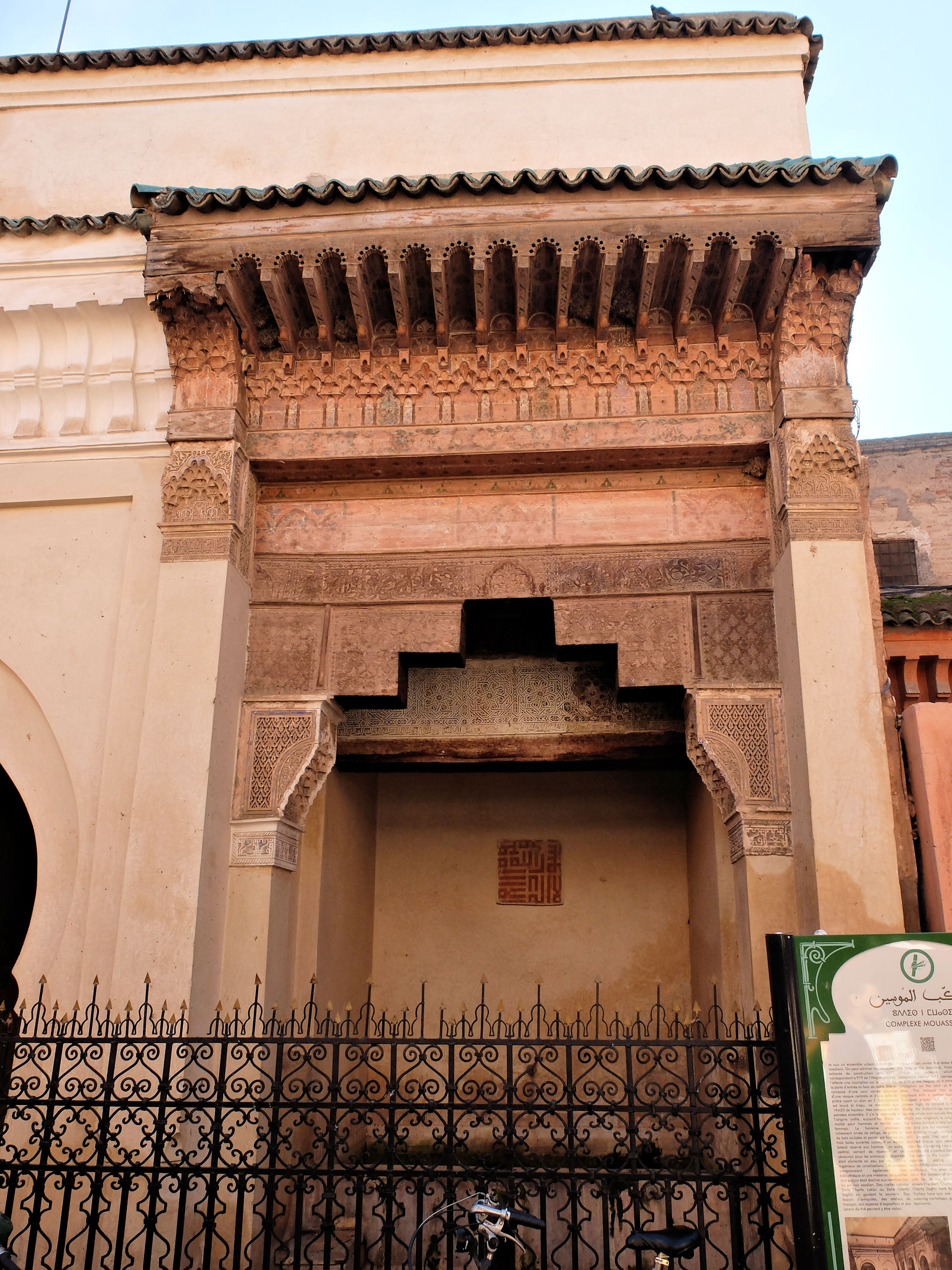
The 16th-century Mouassine Fountain in Marrakech

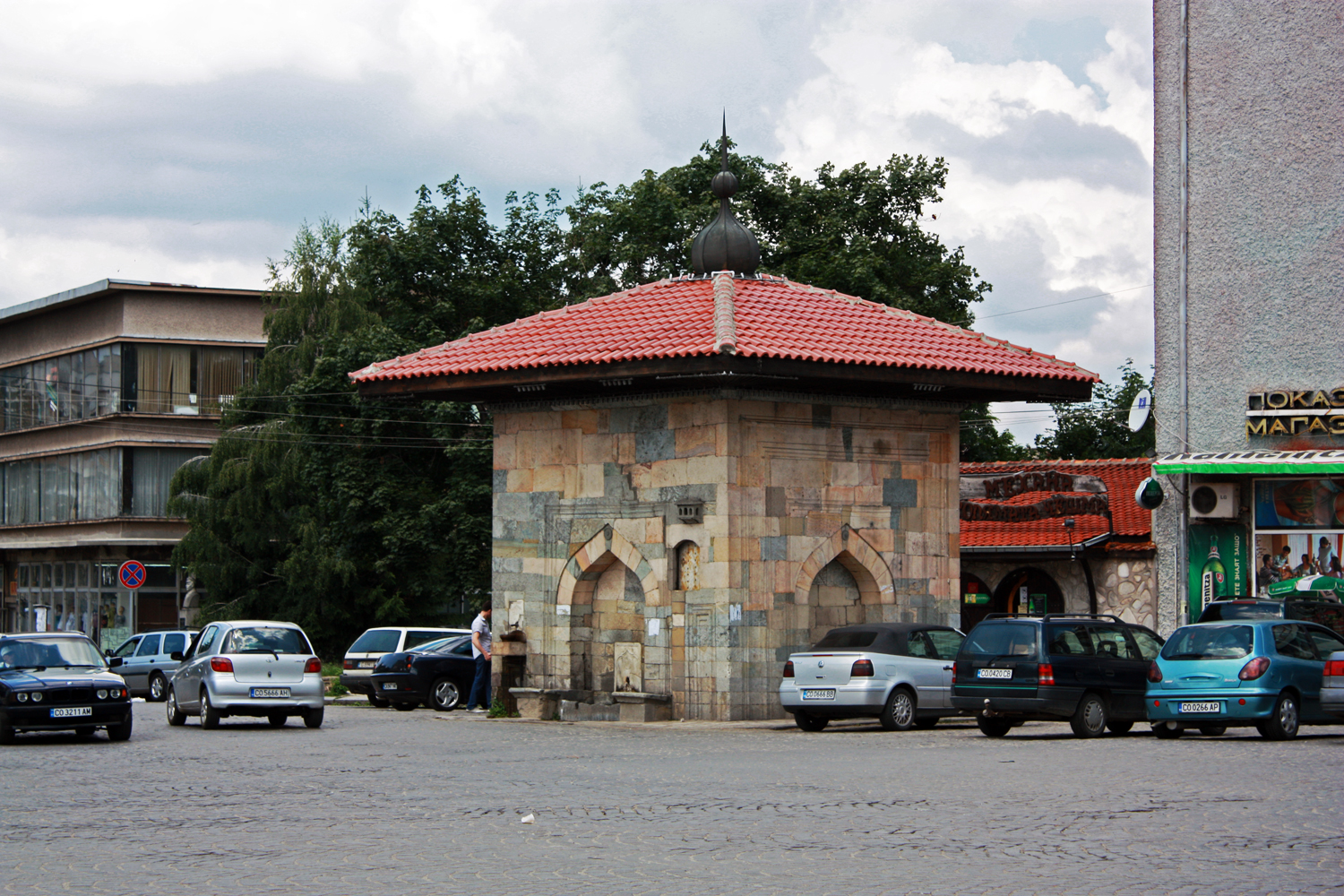
The Grand Fountain in Samokov, Bulgaria, built by the Ottomans in 1660

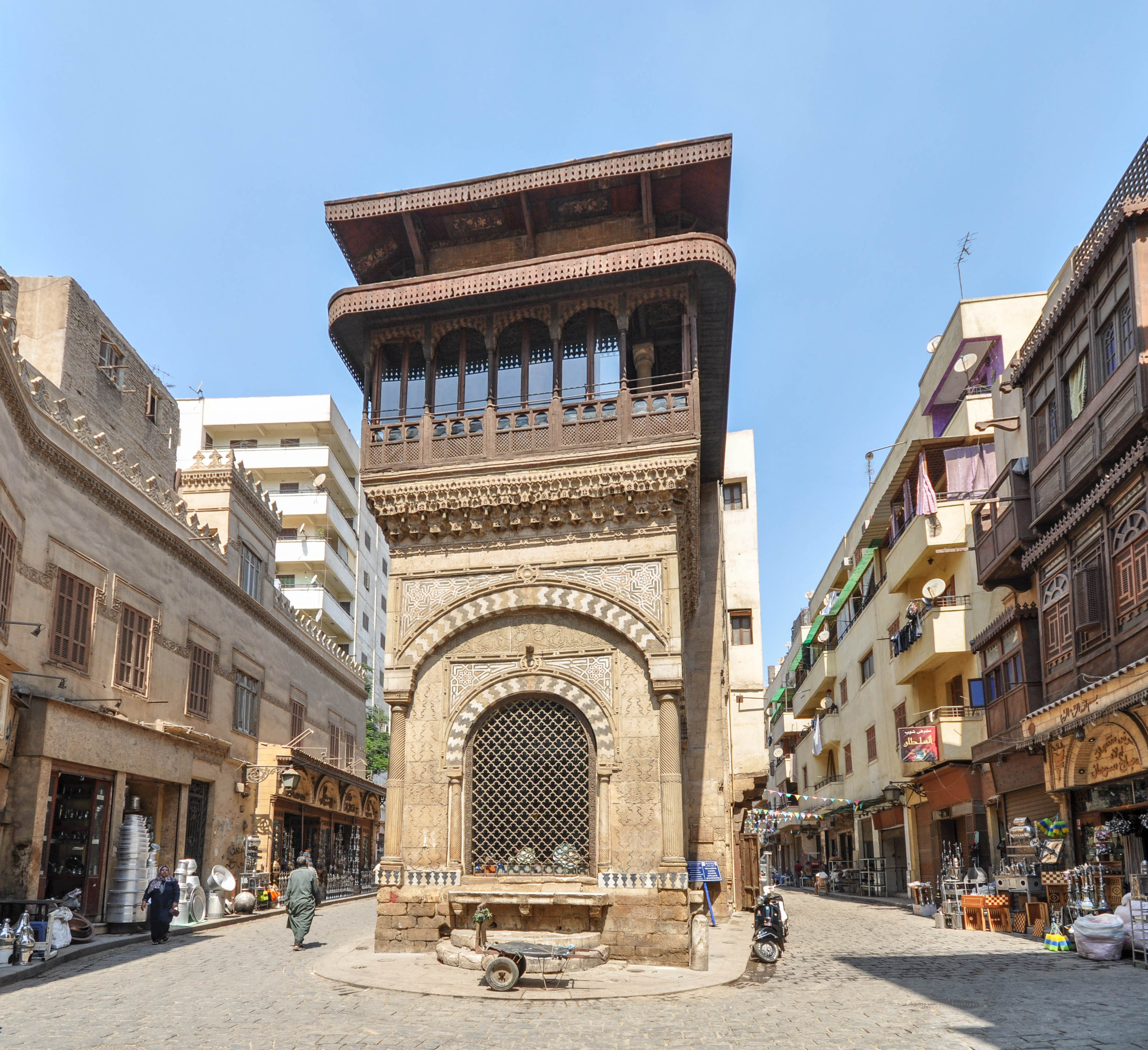
Sabil-Kuttab of Katkhuda, Cairo, (1744)

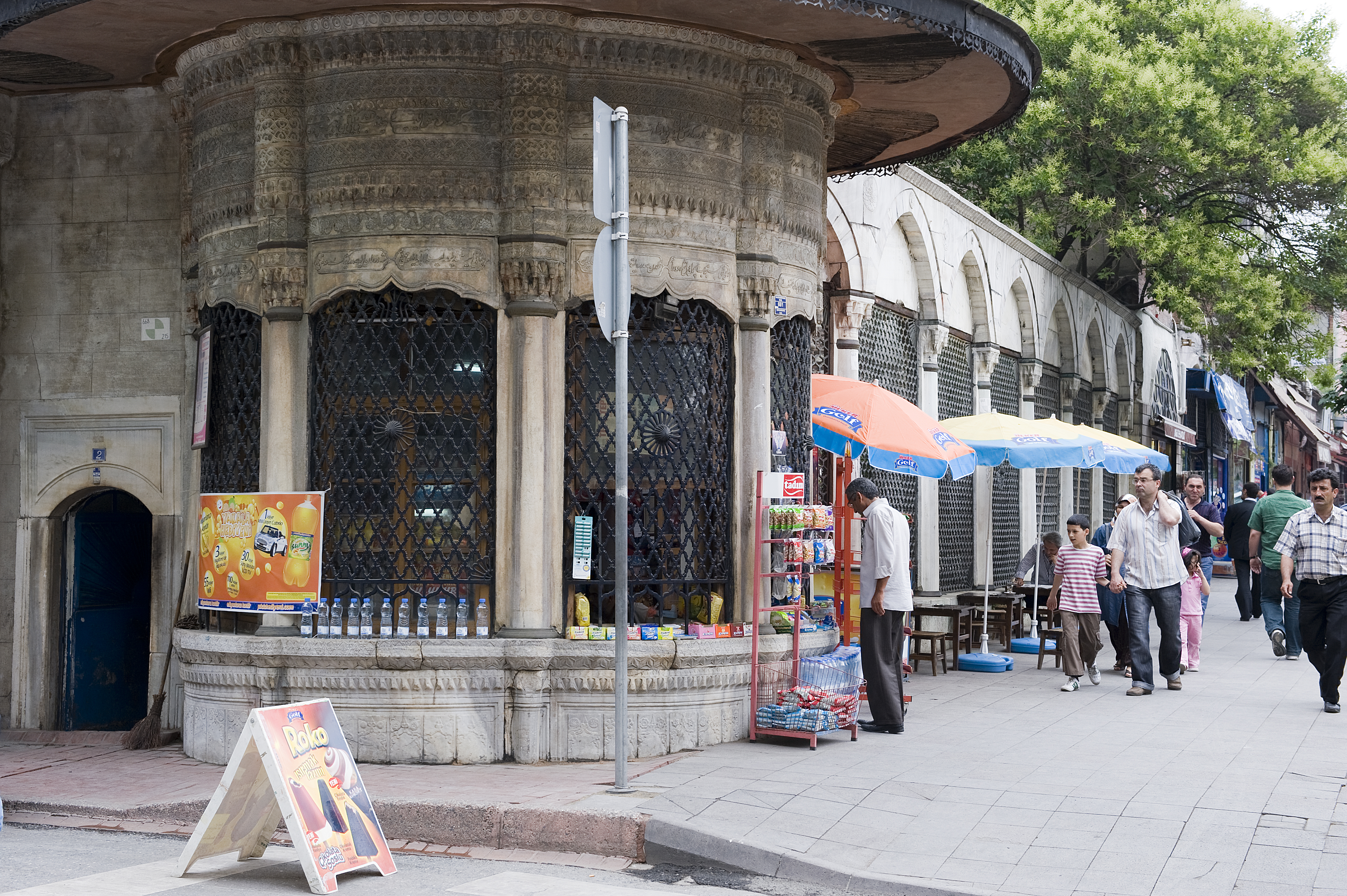
Damat Ibrahim Mosque sebil, Istanbul (1720)

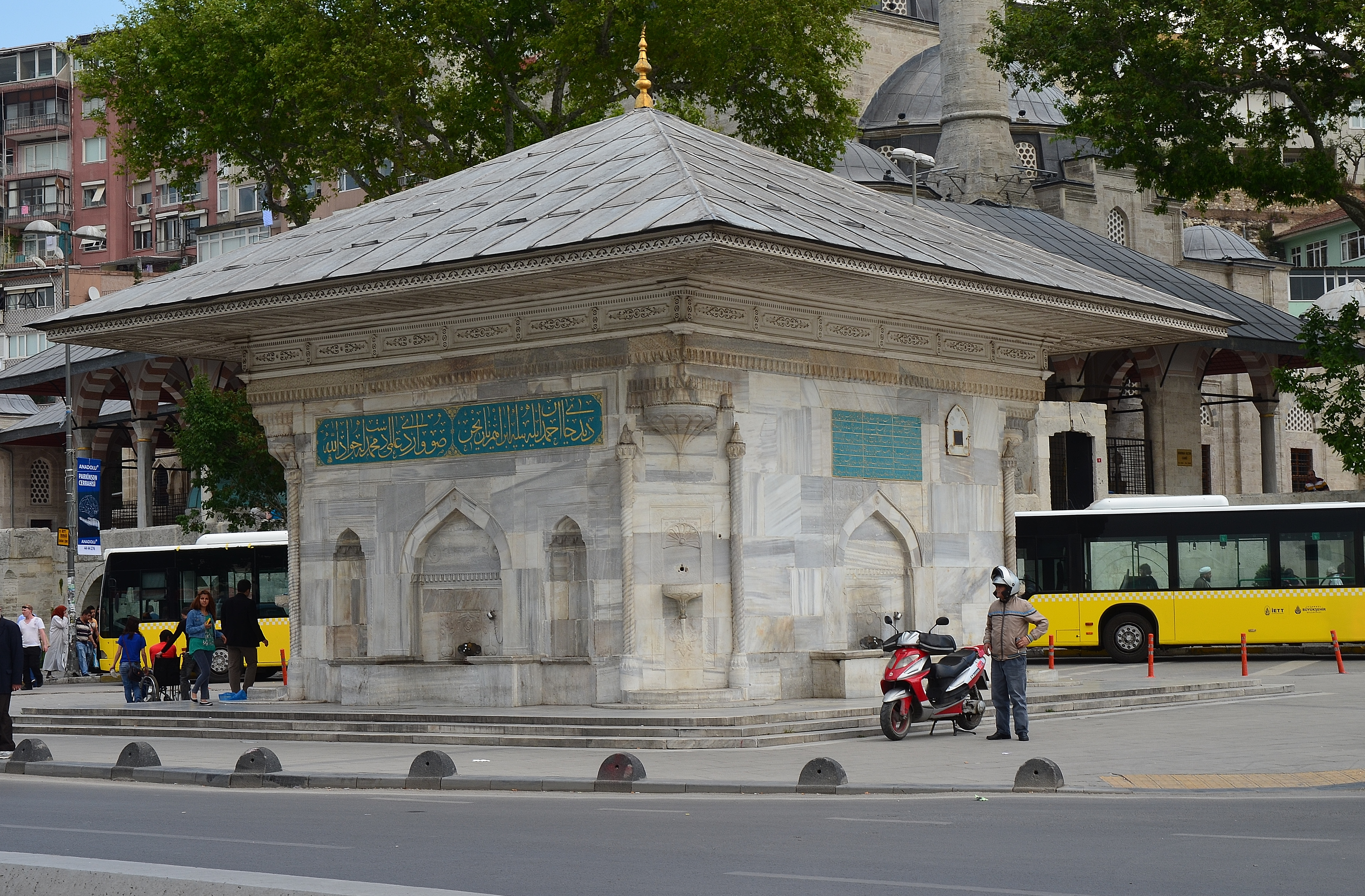
Sultan Ahmed III Fountain in Üsküdar, Istanbul (1728)

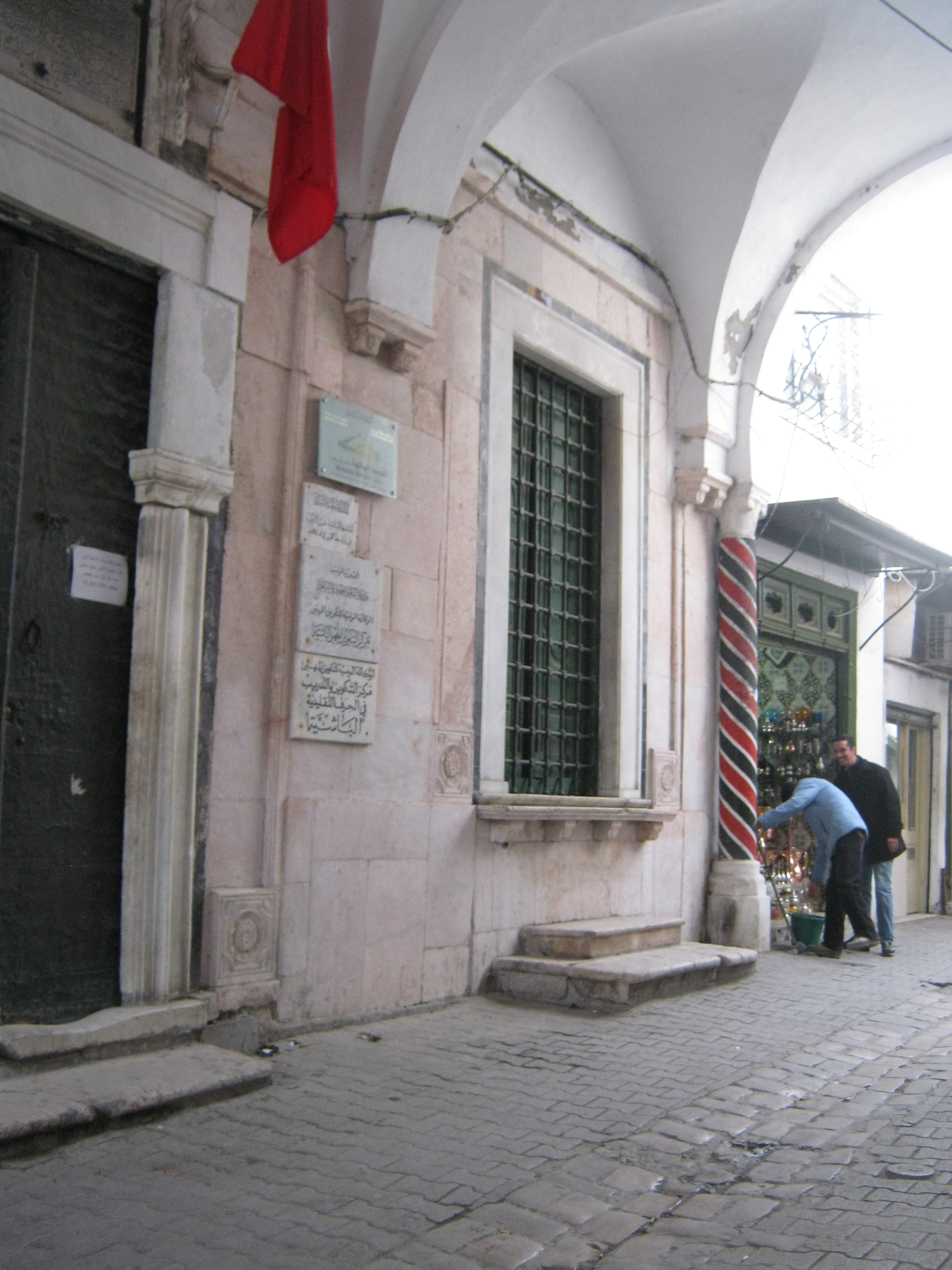
A sabil window in Tunis, next to the entrance of the Madrasa al-Bashiya, dating from 1752

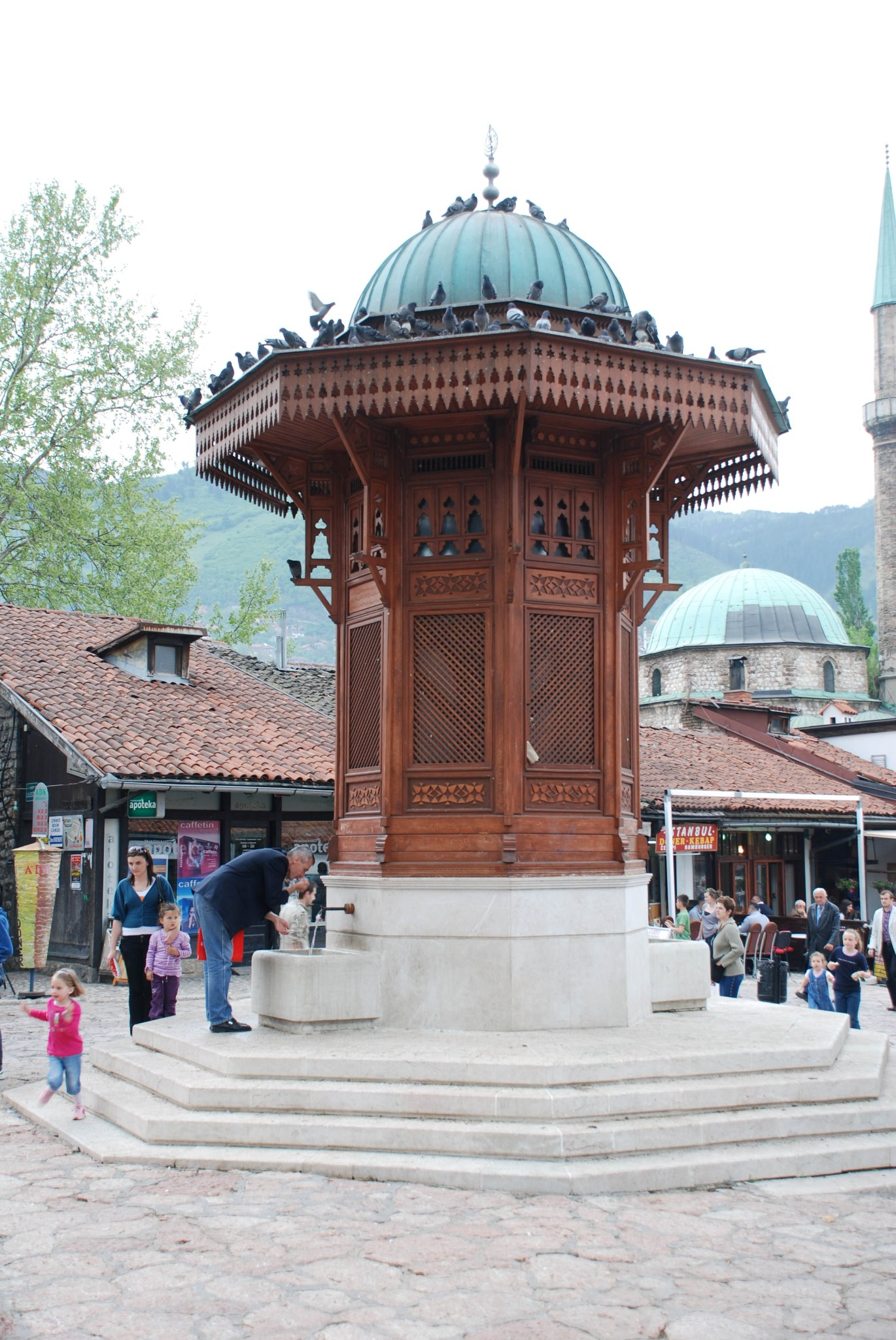
The Sebilj in Baščaršija, Sarajevo (1753)

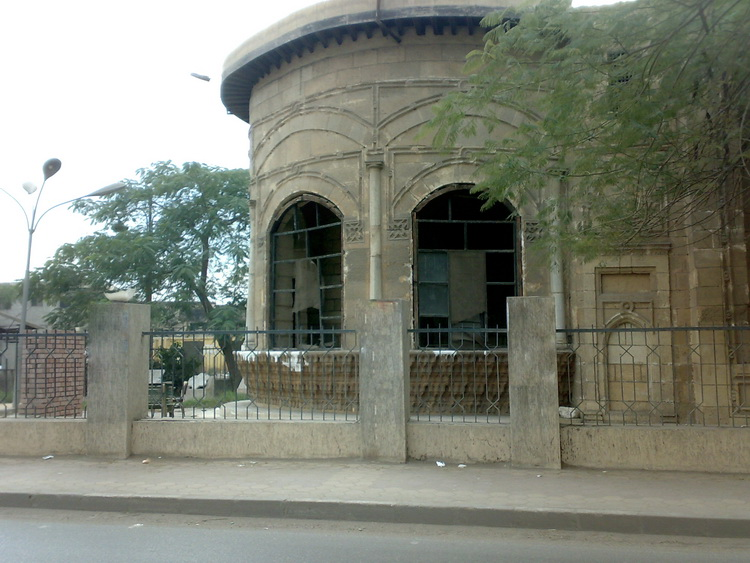
Sabil of Ali Bey Al-Kabir in Tanta, Egypt (18th century)

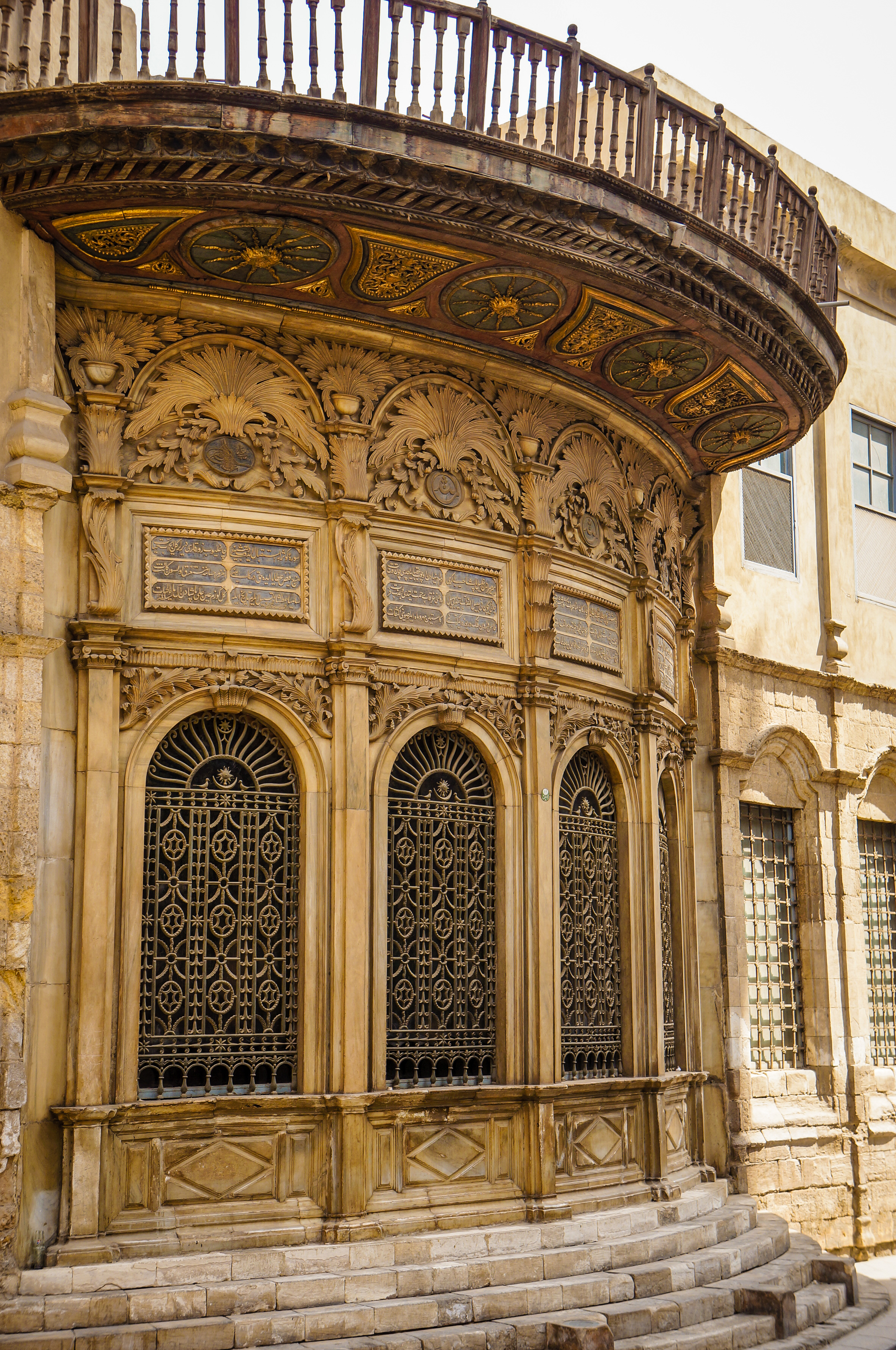
Sabil of Isma'il Pasha in Cairo (1828)

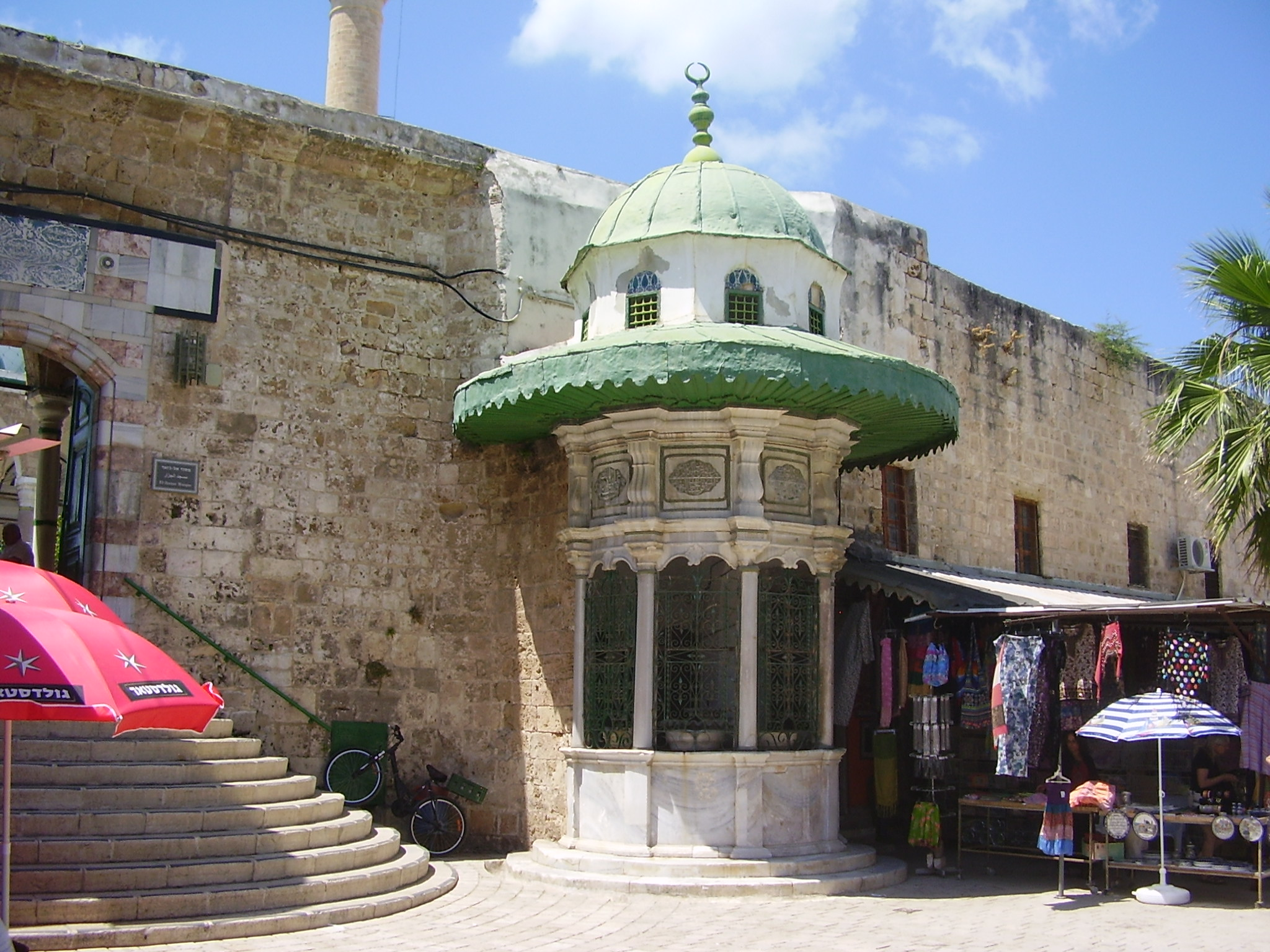
An Ottoman sabil attached to the al-Jazzar Mosque in Acre

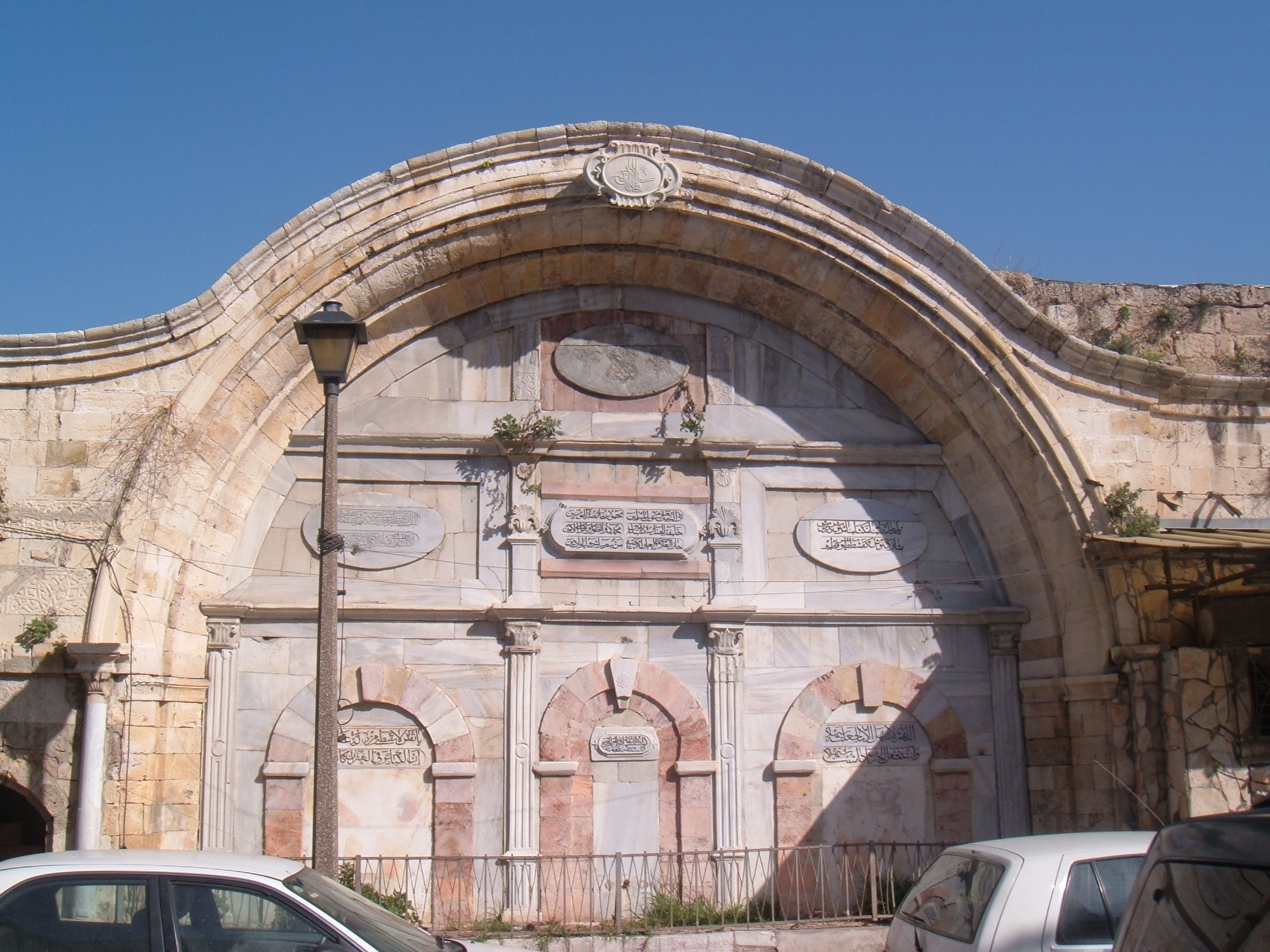
Early 19th-century Ottoman fountain-sabil attached to the Mahmoudiya Mosque in Jaffa, Israel.

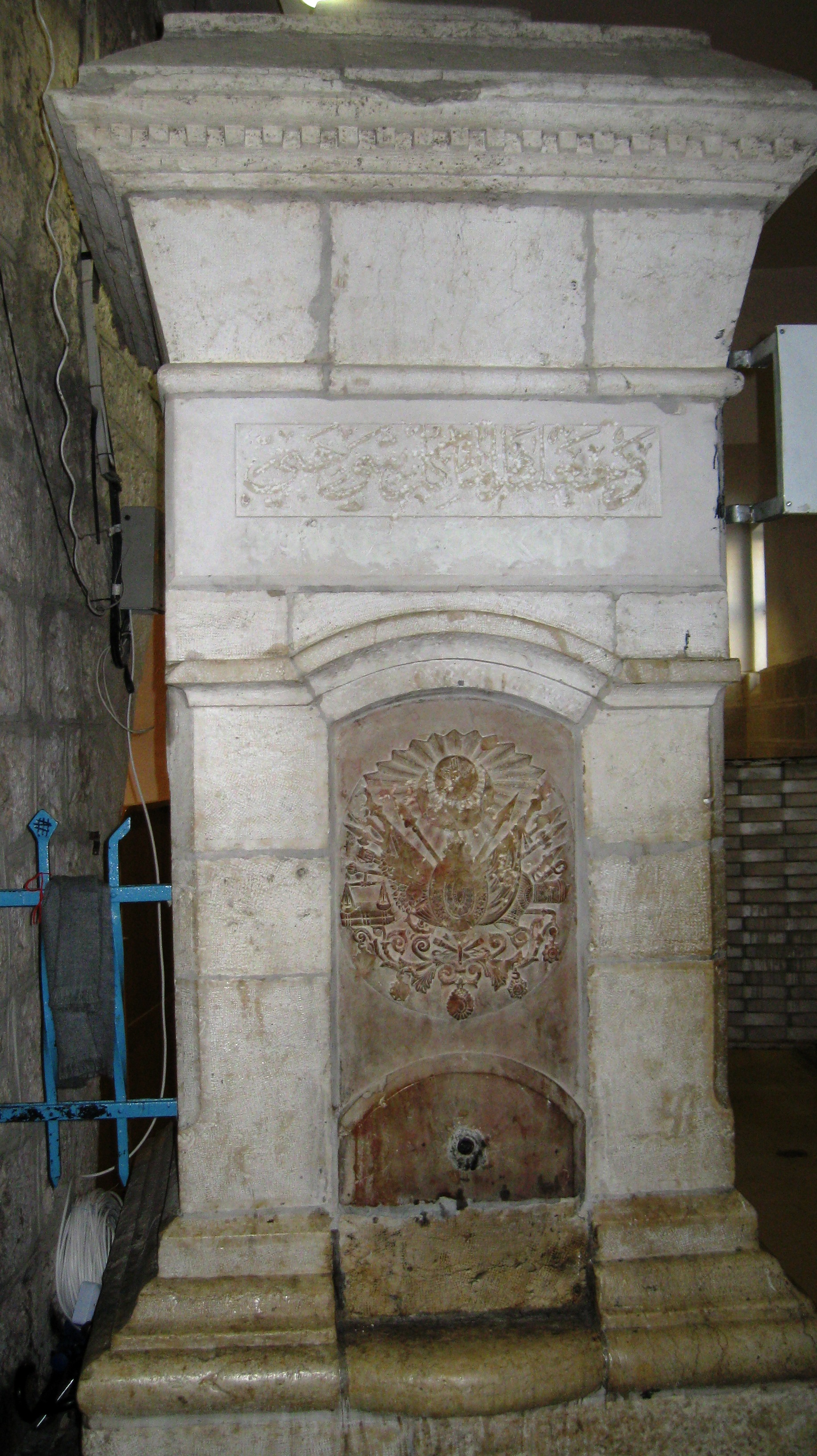
Fountain-sabil outside Rachel's Tomb, near Bethlehem. A late Ottoman coat of arms is carved on its face

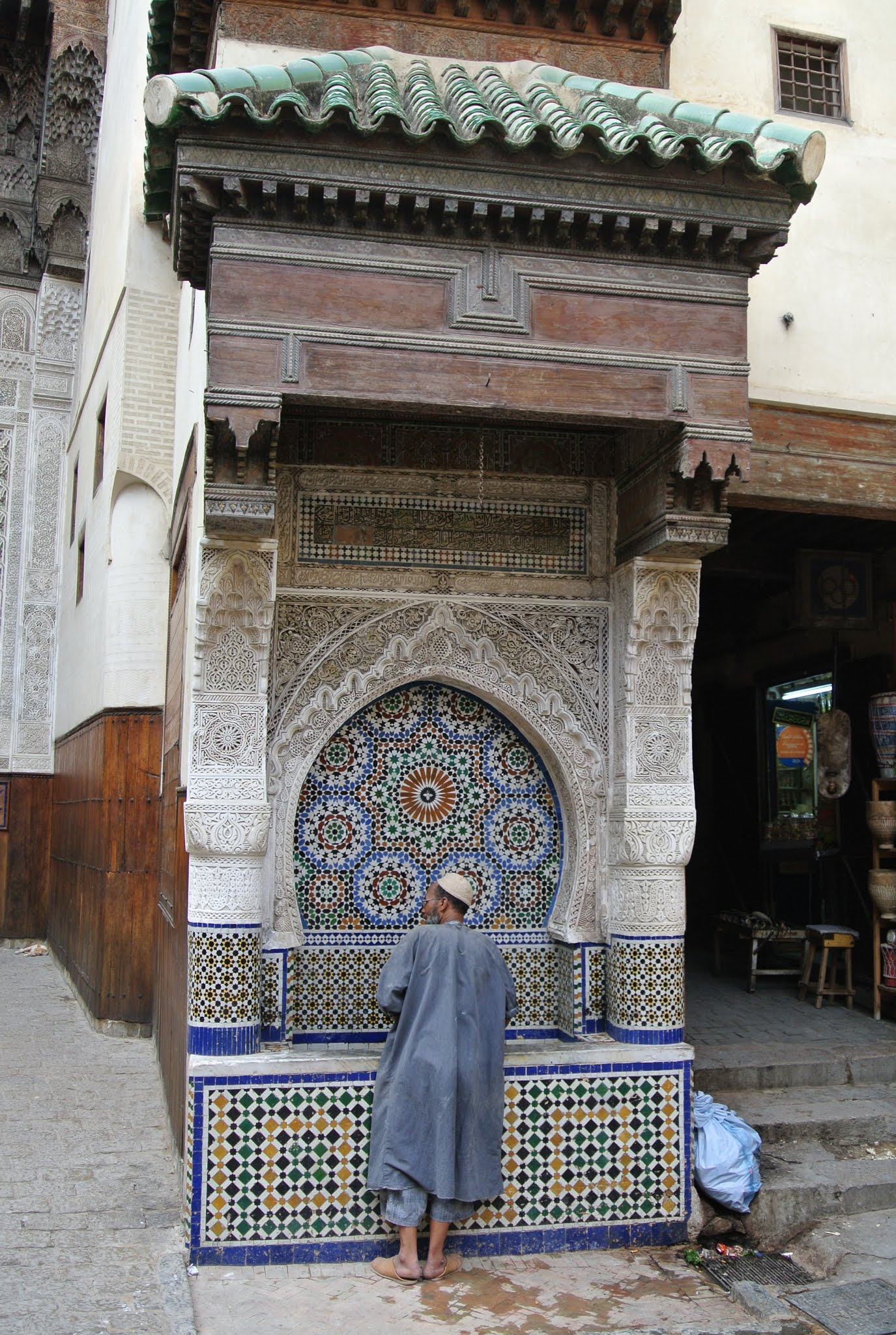
The Nejjarine Fountain in Fes, Morocco (19th-century)

== See also ==
- Cantharus (Christianity), a fountain in the esonarthex of Christian churches for ablutions
- Shadirvan, a typical Ottoman fountain usually built in the yard or at the entrance of religious buildings (mosques, khanqahs, madrasas) and caravanserais.
