= Sabil-Kuttab of Qaytbay =

Sabil-Kuttab of Sultan Qaytbay
- سبيل وكتـّاب السلطان قايتباي (Arabic)
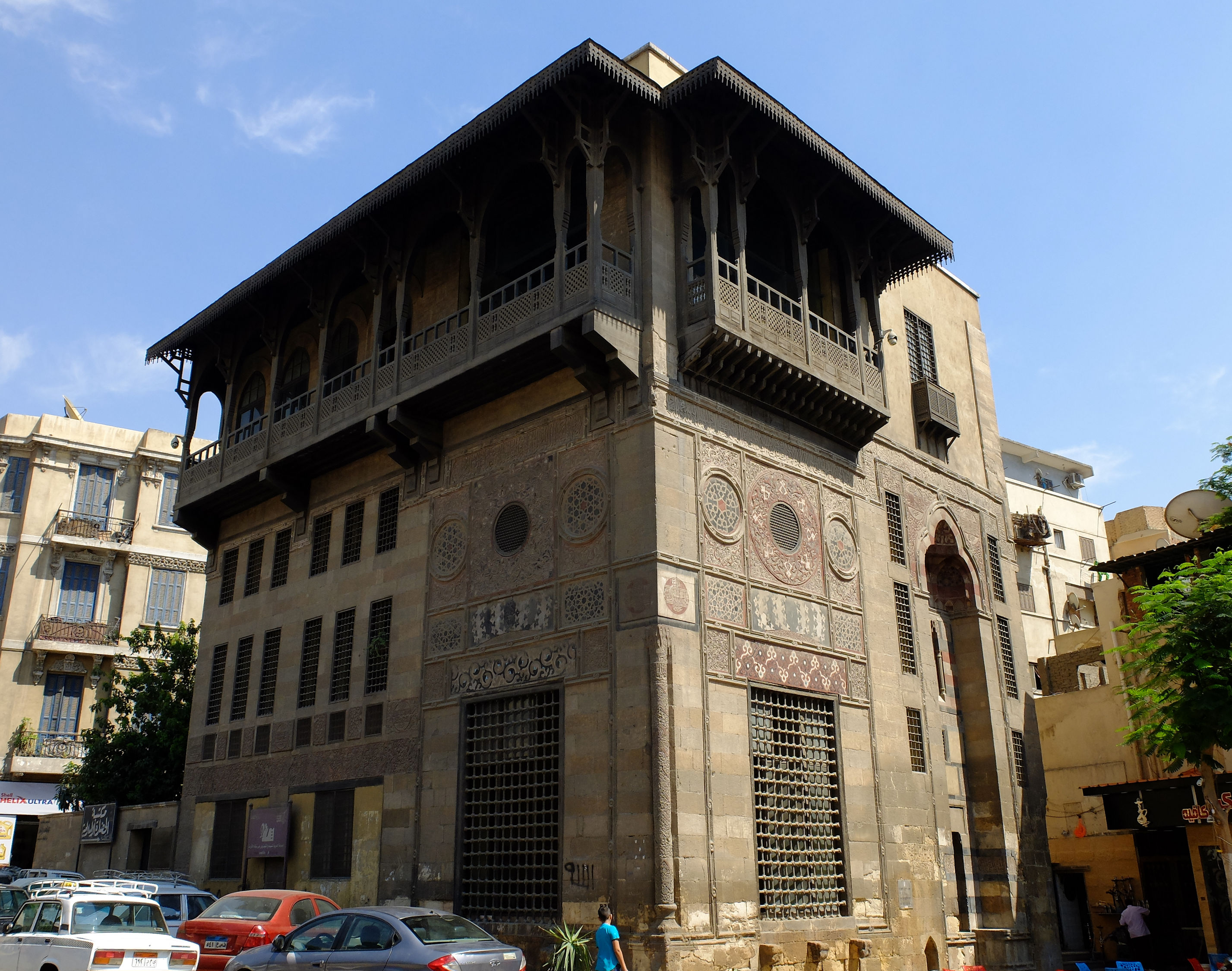
- View of the sabil-kuttab from Saliba street.
- Interactive map of Sabil-Kuttab of Sultan Qaytbay
- 30°01′51″N 31°15′17″E
- Type: Sabil; kuttab

History
- Founder: Sultan al-Ashraf Qaytbay
- Built: 1479 CE (884 AH)

Site notes
- Architectural styles: Mamluk, Islamic
- Restored: 1999
- Restored by: Supreme Council of Antiquities; Agencia Española de Cooperacion Internacional
- Current use: tourist attraction (historic site); the Suzanne Mubarak Center for Islamic Civilization

The Sabil-Kuttab of Sultan Qaytbay is a Mamluk-era charitable foundation and building in Cairo, Egypt. It was built in 1479 on the order of Sultan al-Ashraf Qaytbay and is located on Saliba Street in the historic districts of Cairo.

The building is composed of a sabil (a water distribution kiosk) on the ground floor and a kuttab (primary school teaching the Qur'an) on the upper floors. Below the structure, underground, is a cistern from which water was drawn for the sabil. The structure was the first free-standing sabil-kuttab in Cairo; a type of building that would later become quite common during the Ottoman period.

== Gallery ==
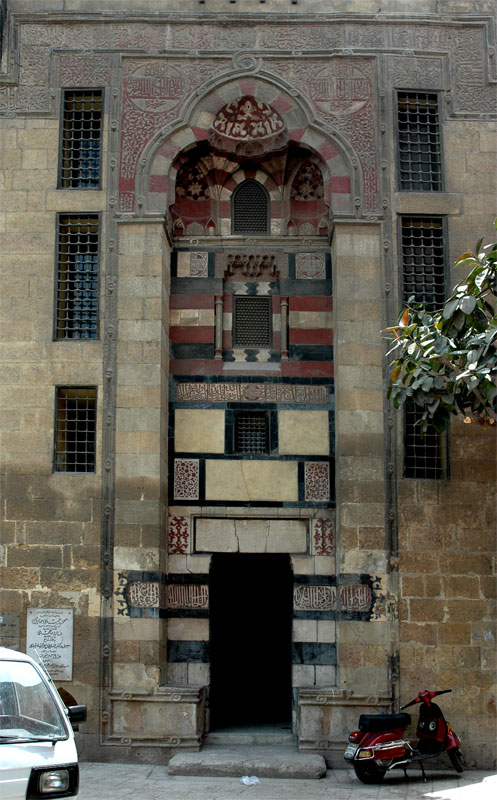
Entrance portal.

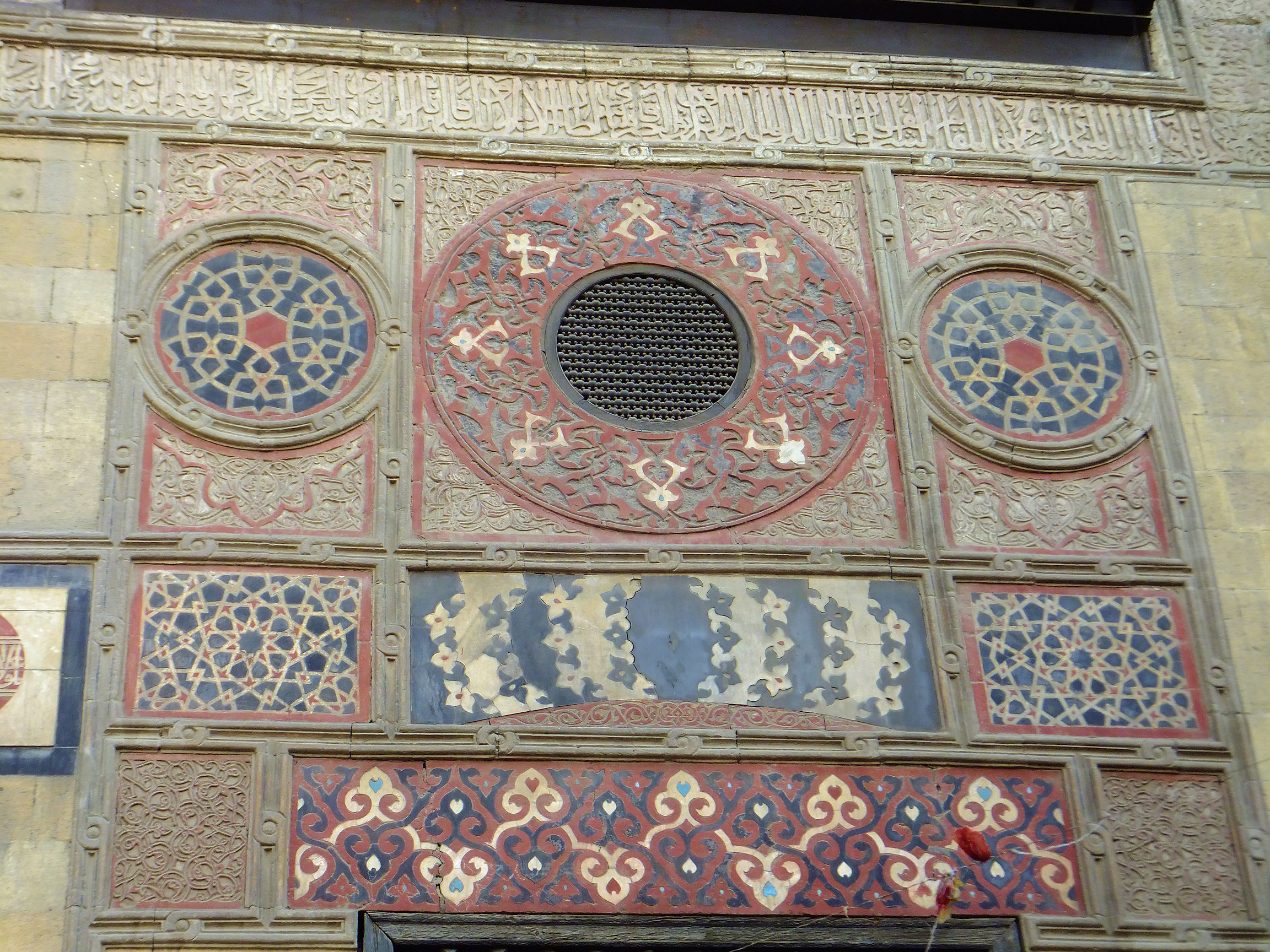
Exterior polychrome marble and stone-carving decoration

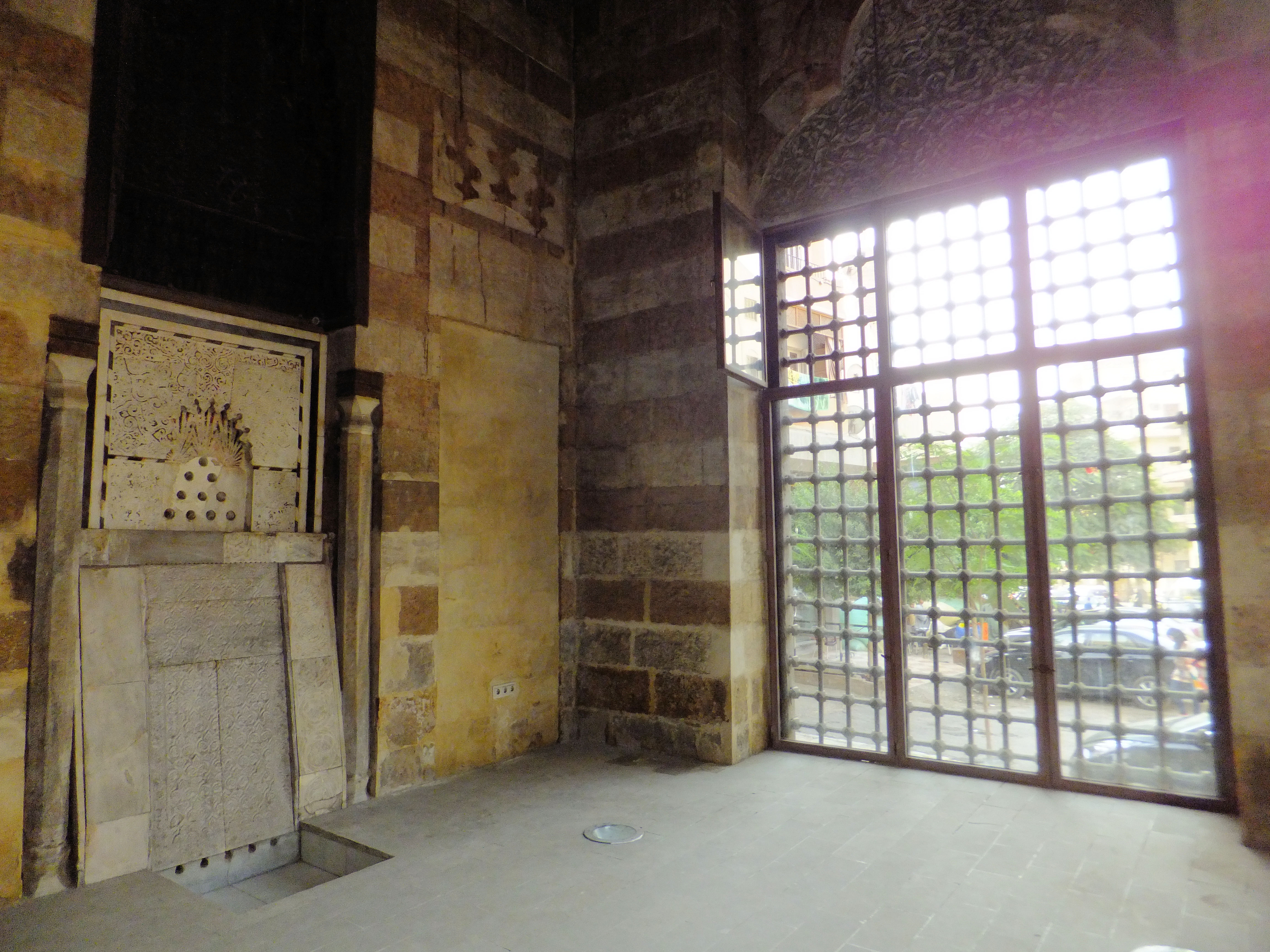
Interior of sabil chamber, with window through which attendant gave out water.

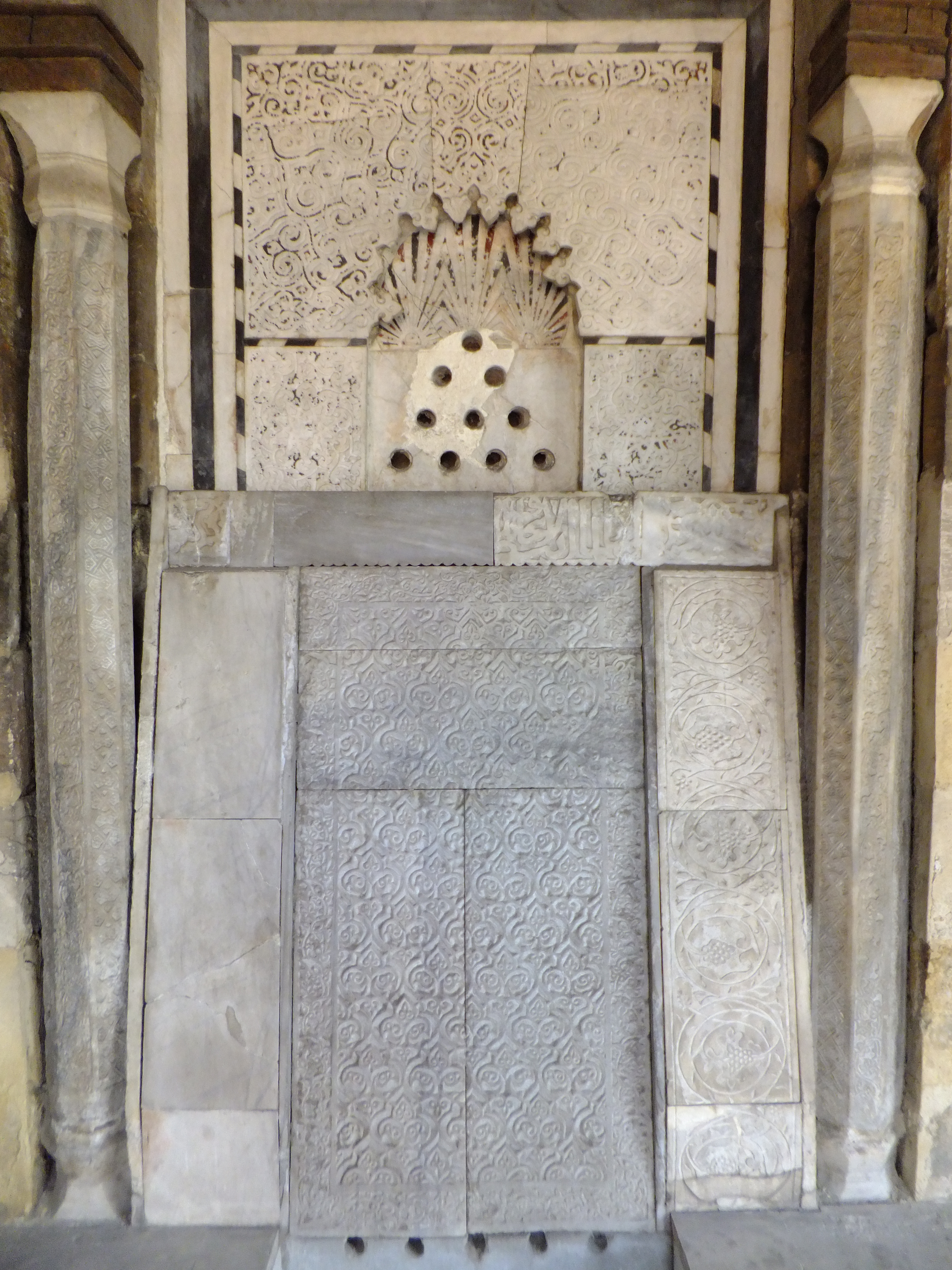
Marble salsabil over which water flowed inside the attendant's chamber.

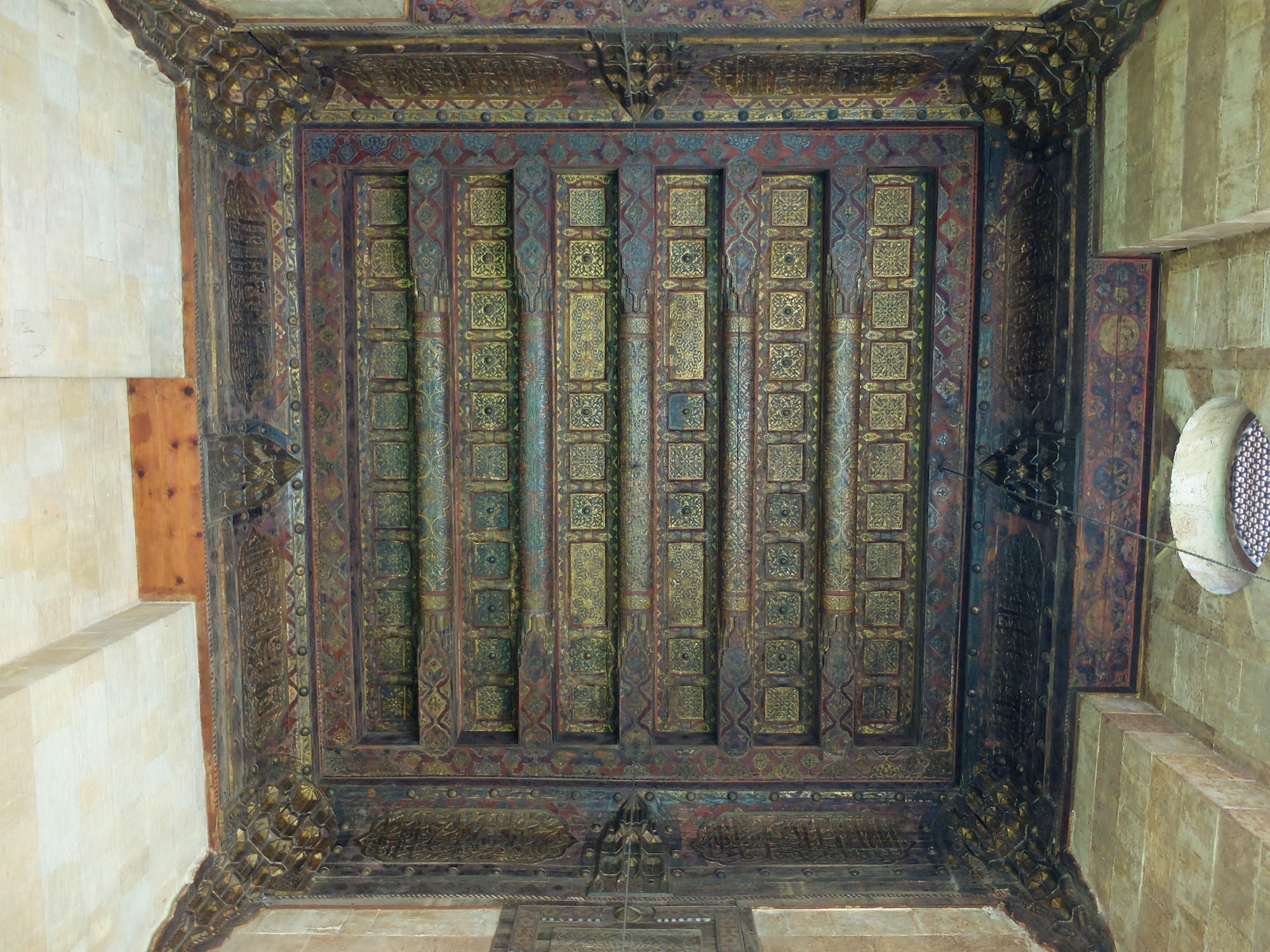
Painted wooden ceiling inside the sabil chamber.

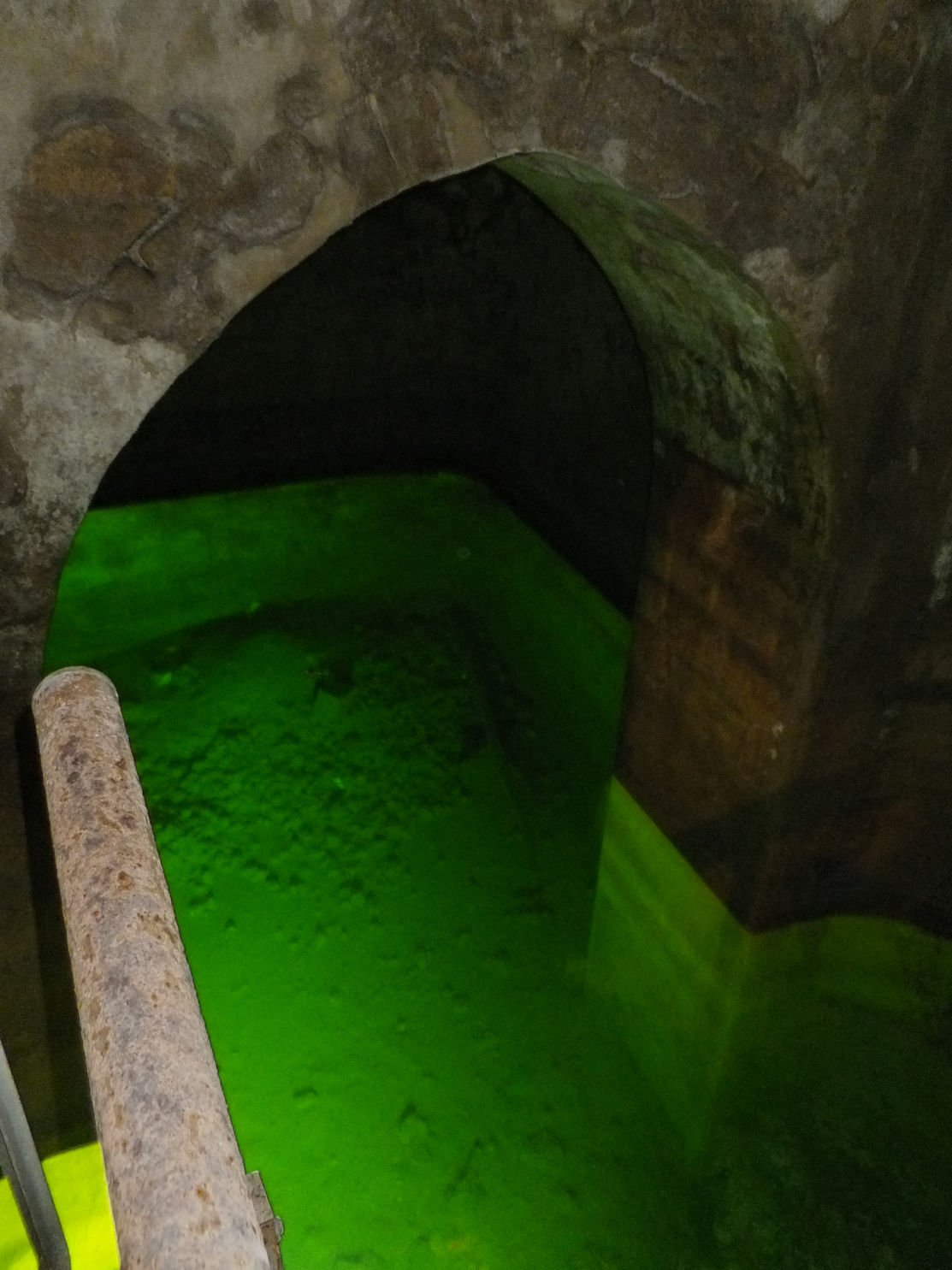
The underground water cistern.

== See also ==
- Sabil of Qaytbay (at the Temple Mount in Jerusalem)
- Wikala and Sabil-Kuttab of Qaytbay (at al-Azhar)
- Funerary complex of Sultan Qaytbay (at the Northern Cemetery)
- Mamluk architecture
