= Sabil-Kuttab of Abd al-Rahman Katkhuda =

Coordinates: 30°3′2.63″N 31°15′41.69″E

- 'سبيل وكتاب عبدالرحمن كتخدا'
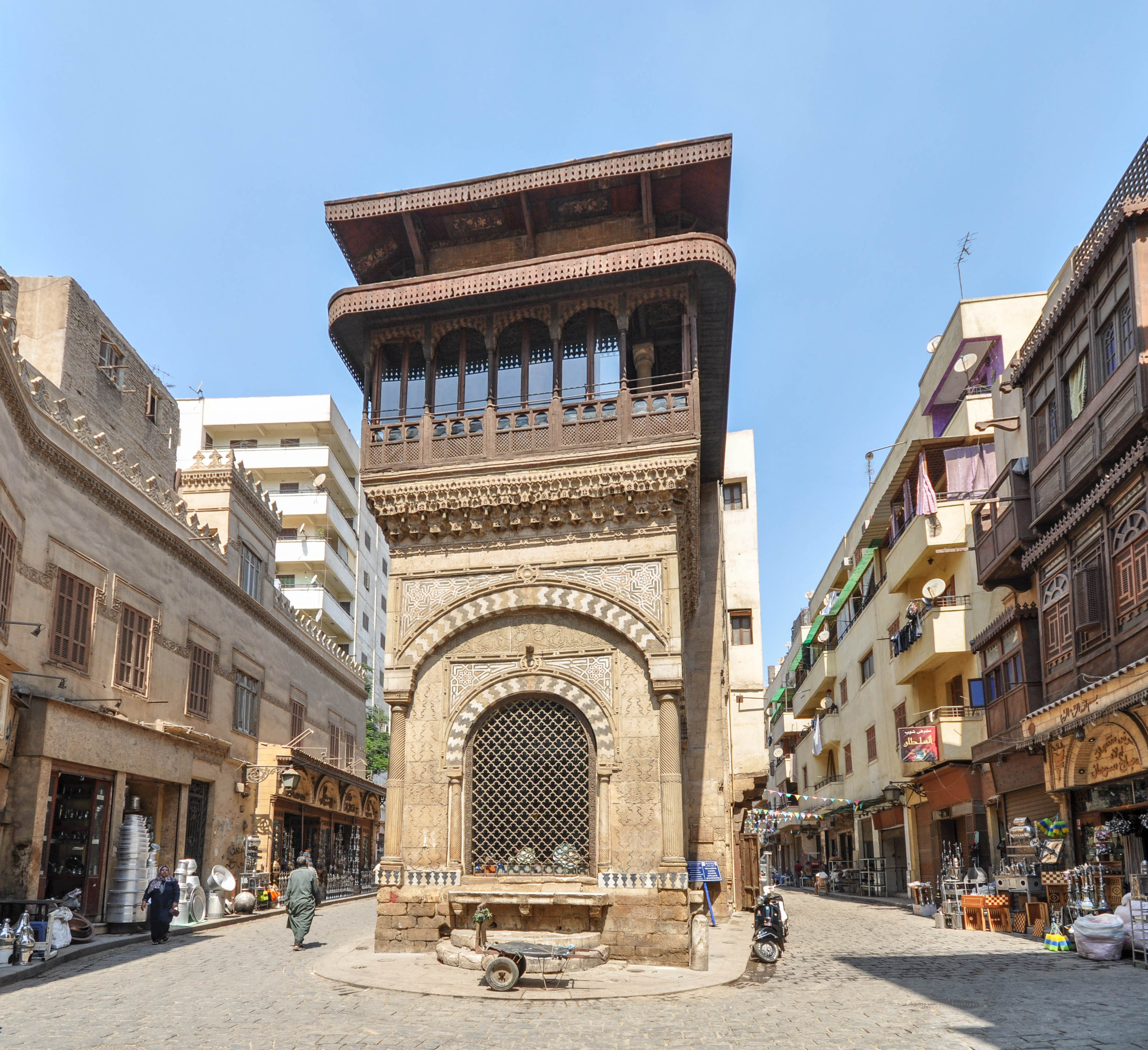
- Interactive map of the Sabil-Kuttab of Abd al-Rahman Katkhuda area

General information
- Type: sabil fountain kuttab elementary school residential wing
- Location: Al-Muizz Lideenillah Street, Cairo, Egypt
- Completed: 1744 AD

Design and construction
- Architect: Abd al-Rahman Katkhuda

Sabil-Kuttab of Abd al-Rahman Katkhuda (Arabic: سبيل وكتاب عبدالرحمن كتخدا) is a historic monument in the historic district of Cairo, Egypt. It comprises a public fountain or sabil, an elementary Quran school or kuttab, and an adjacent residential wing. A prime example of Egyptian architecture of its time, it was commissioned in 1744 by Abd al-Rahman Katkhuda, a local official who was a prominent patron of architecture.

== Historical overview ==
Sabil-Kuttab of Katkhuda is an important monument in Cairo, located on Al-Muizz Street. Built in 1744 CE, it is named for its patron, a Mamluk amir (prince) and leader of the Egyptian Janissaries, who died in 1776. He did much work in Cairo including developments to Al-Azhar University and mosque. He also rebuilt the dome of the Qala'un Mosque after an earthquake in Egypt.

Sabils and kuttabs were almost everywhere in old Islamic Cairo during Mamluk and Ottoman times. Sabils are facilities providing free, fresh water for thirsty people who are passing by. Kuttabs are primitive kinds of elementary schools that teach children to read and write.

The Sabil-Kuttab was built using the Mamluk Egyptian style which continued to overwhelm all the styles of such buildings even after the Ottoman conquest in 1517. The architecture of this time was so delicate that even simple facilities like sabils were designed to be pieces of art.

== Architecture ==
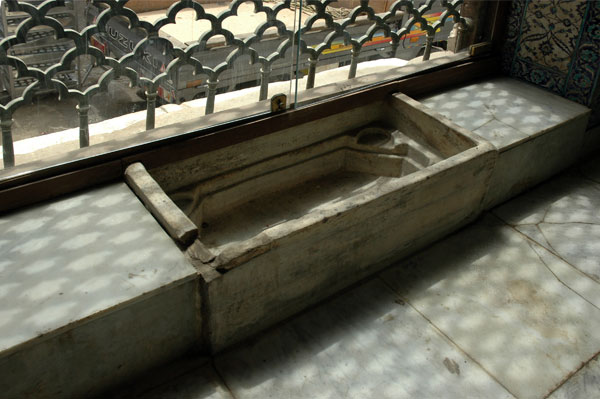
The counter inside the sabil room where attendants distributed water to passers-by outside

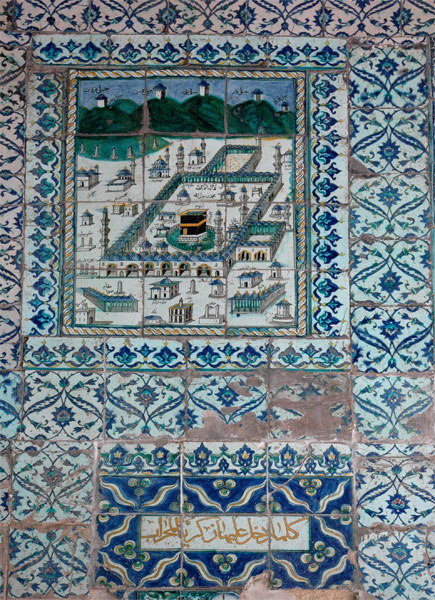
Ottoman tiles inside the sabil room, including an illustration of the Great Mosque of Mecca

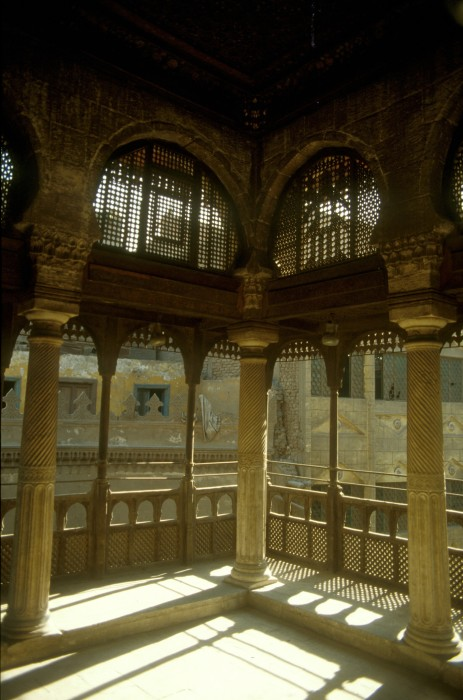
The kuttab room on the upper floor

The Sabil-Kuttab was built to achieve the maximum available visibility in Al-Muizz Street. This was achieved through building it with three free-standing sides.

The building consists of two main parts. The southern part is two stories high and contains the sabil and the kuttab from which it derives its name. The northern part is not registered and is being used now as living apartments. Sabil is an Arabic word for the place or the building which offers free fresh drinking water to passers-by or whoever asks for it. A kuttab is a place which provides elementary education for children. It was very common in old Islamic Egypt. Kuttabs are still available as an activity of some mosques to teach the children the Quran.

The building is open on three sides and consists of grey and white stones inlaid with marble reliefs. There are also, tiles with embedded pillars at its corners.

The entrance of the Sabil has artistic writings which are verses from the Quran about "Ahl Al-Kahf". This is commonly seen in Katkhuda's buildings.

The kuttab is located on the second floor and is composed of five marbled columns holding the painted roof. The windows are wooden and have beautiful artistic design. This type of window is called "mashrabeyya", which is characteristic of almost all buildings of Islamic Cairo. The door and the cupboards are wooden and are carved and painted.

The structure sits on a triangular site formed by the splitting of Al-Muizz Street into two branches. It serves as a visual focus for the termination of this major spine, especially to those approaching it from the monuments of the Qalawunids in the Bayn al-Qasrayn area.

The three sides of the building (northern, southern and western) are symmetrical, accurately identical, and all equal in length. Each contains all the interface to hold half the circular based on two columns of marble. In the middle of the half-circular structure is a big opening that contains the cups for people to drink. The opening is covered by a uniquely designed copper mesh with holes allowing the passage of the cups in between the holes.

The entrance of the Sabil leads to a small corridor with three doors. The first door, on the right leads to the water storing tank; the second door, on the left leads to a room with openings from which the people can drink (the sabil); the third door, opposite to the entrance, leads to the stairs of the kuttab. The horizontal dimensions of the sabil room are 4.0 x 3.5 meters.

The kuttab room is present in the second floor and it has the same dimensions as the sabil room with three windows each called mashrabeyya.

== See also ==
List of Historic Monuments in Cairo

== Bibliography ==
- Rogers, Michael. 1974. Al-Kahira, in Encyclopaedia of Islam, 2nd ed., vol. 4. Leiden: E. J. Brill.
- Behrens-Abouseif, Doris. 1992. The 'Abd al-Rahman Katkhuda Style in 18th c. Cairo. Annales Islamologiques 26.
- Raymond, André. 1979. Les fontaines publiques (sabil) du Caire à l'époque ottomane (1517-1798). Annales Islamologiques 15:235-91.
- Raymond, André. 1972. Les Constructions de l'Emir 'Abd al-Rahman Katkhuda au Caire. Annales Islamologiques 11:235-51.
- 'Abd al-Rahman Katkhuda Sabil-Kuttab
- Sabils of Cairo
