= Aqmar Mosque =

Mosque in Cairo, Egypt

- جامع الأقمر
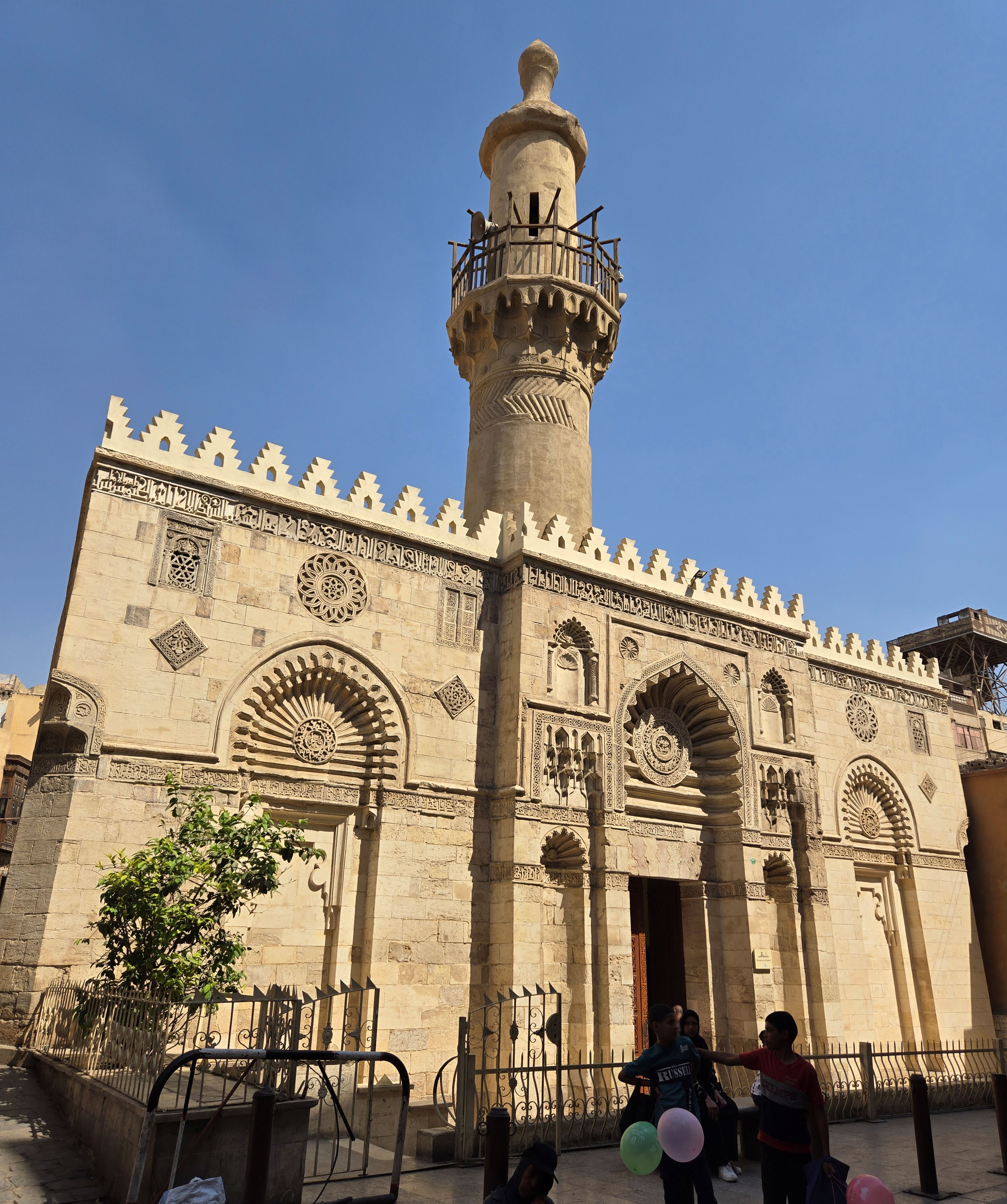

Religion
- Affiliation: Sunni Islam
- Ecclesiastical or organisational status: Mosque
- Status: Active

Location
- Location: al-Mu'izz Street, Islamic Cairo
- Country: Egypt
- Interactive map of Aqmar Mosque
- Coordinates: 30°03′06″N 31°15′43″E

Architecture
- Type: Mosque
- Style: Fatimid
- Founder: al-Ma'mun al-Bata'ihi
- Completed: 1125
- Minaret: 1

The Aqmar Mosque or al-Aqmar Mosque (Arabic: الجامع الأقمر, romanized: al-jāmiʿ al-aqmar, lit. 'Moonlit Mosque'), is a mosque located in Cairo, Egypt. Built as a neighborhood mosque by the Fatimid vizier al-Ma'mun al-Bata'ihi in 1125, the mosque is situated on what was once the main avenue and ceremonial heart of Cairo, known today as al-Mu'izz Street, in the immediate neighborhood of the former Fatimid caliphal palaces. The mosque is an important monument of Fatimid architecture and of historic Cairo due to the exceptional decoration of its exterior façade and the innovative design of its floor plan.

== History ==
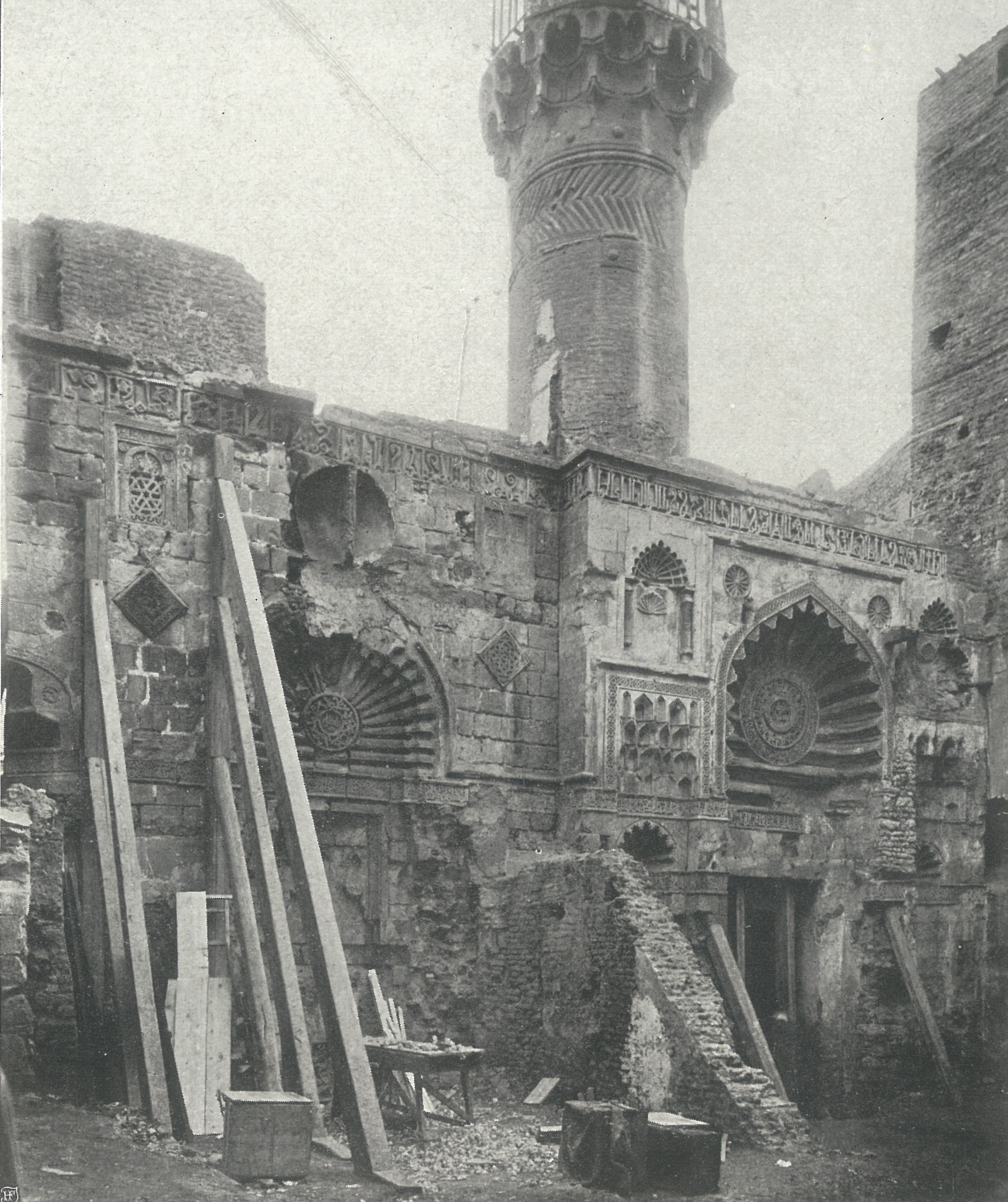
The mosque in 1906, before modern restorations. (The right half of the facade was missing.)

The mosque was built by the Fatimid vizier al-Ma'mun al-Bata'ihi, who served in this position from 1121 to 1125 under the Caliph al-Amir. He served during a period of great political and spiritual crisis for the Fatimid Caliphate, not long after the sudden incursion of the First Crusade. He initiated a number of reforms and revived the ceremonial aspects of the caliphate, both at court and in public. He also conducted other constructions and renovations inside the Fatimid Great Palaces.

The al-Aqmar Mosque was completed in 1125, as documented by an inscription dating it to 519 AH on the Muslim calendar. Al-Ma'mun was arrested that year, shortly after completing the mosque, and was executed three years later.He had grown up in poverty following his father's death and, before being hired by the vizier al-Afdal (his predecessor), he had been working low-status jobs which reportedly included learning building skills. This early experience may have encouraged his later architectural achievements.

The mosque was built at the northeastern corner of the eastern Fatimid Great Palace, and may have served both the neighbourhood and the palace inhabitants. Its adjacency to the palace may have been one reason why it did not feature a minaret; in order to prevent anyone climbing the minaret from looking down into the caliph's palaces. Similarly to Al-Azhar Mosque (970) and the Al-Hakim Mosque (990–1013), formerly named al-Anwar, the name of the al-Aqmar mosque is an epithet of the patron in connection with light.

The Mamluk amir Yalbugha al-Salimi restored the mosque in 1393 or 1397 and added a minaret (which collapsed in 1412 and was later restored) as well as shop stalls to the right of the entrance. Al-Salimi also restored or replaced the minbar, the mihrab, and the ablutions area. The mosque was restored again in the 19th century, during the reign of Muhammad 'Ali (r. 1805–1848), by amir Sulayman Agha al-Silahdar, who also built a nearby mosque across the street.

In 1993, the mosque was extensively and heavily renovated by the Dawoodi Bohras. This included the replacement of al-Salimi's mihrab with a new marble mihrab and the reconstruction of the southern half of the exterior façade by replicating the preserved northern half. This renovation has been criticized for sacrificing some historic elements of the mosque, especially in its interior.

== Architecture ==
The mosque has been called a "seminal" monument in the architectural history of Cairo. It is significant for two features in particular: the decoration of its façade and the design of its floor plan.

=== Layout ===
The mosque of al-Aqmar was the first building in Cairo with an adjustment to the street alignment. The plan of the mosque of al-Aqmar is hypostyle, with an internal square courtyard surrounded by roofed sections defined by rows of four-centered arches. The prayer hall on the qibla side is three bays or aisles deep while the gallery on bay around the courtyard is one bay deep. Each bay is covered by a shallow brick dome. However, this type of roofing is not attested in other monuments of the Fatimid architecture. Therefore, it is likely that the mosque originally had a flat ceiling but that when Yalbugha al-Salimi restored it from ruin in the 14th century it was given these vaulted ceilings, which resemble the type of ceiling used in the Khanqah of Faraj ibn Barquq, a Mamluk monument from the early 15th century.

The novelty of the floor plan lies in the facade's alignment with the street in contrast with its interior space, which remains oriented towards the qibla. In order to accommodate this difference in angle while still maintaining internal symmetry, the structure uses variations in wall thickness. Here, street alignment starts to play a pivotal role because al-Mu'izz Street – previously known as the Qasaba – was the most important avenue in the city and it's possible that the architects desired the mosque's façade to be in harmony with the adjacent Fatimid caliphal palaces. The mosque was also originally placed above a row of shops, but the street level has risen so much in the intervening centuries that these are now buried. The income from the rents of these shops contributed to the revenues of the waqf (charitable endowment) which maintained the mosque's operation and upkeep. This design is similar to the Mosque of al-Salih Tala'i, built by the Fatimids later in the same century, whose shops have been excavated and are visible today below the street level.

General elements

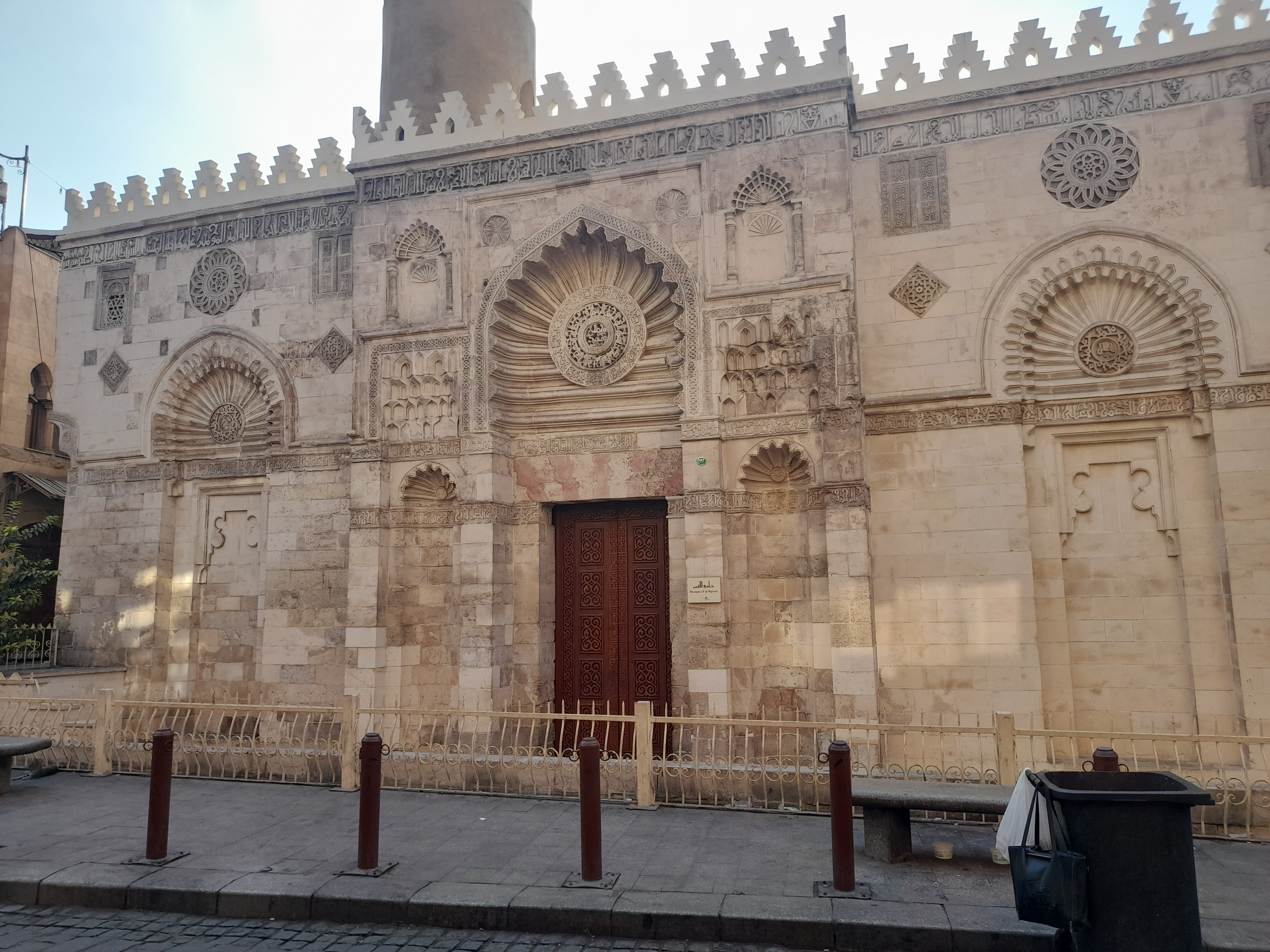
The street façade (the portion to the right of the entrance portal is a recent reconstruction)

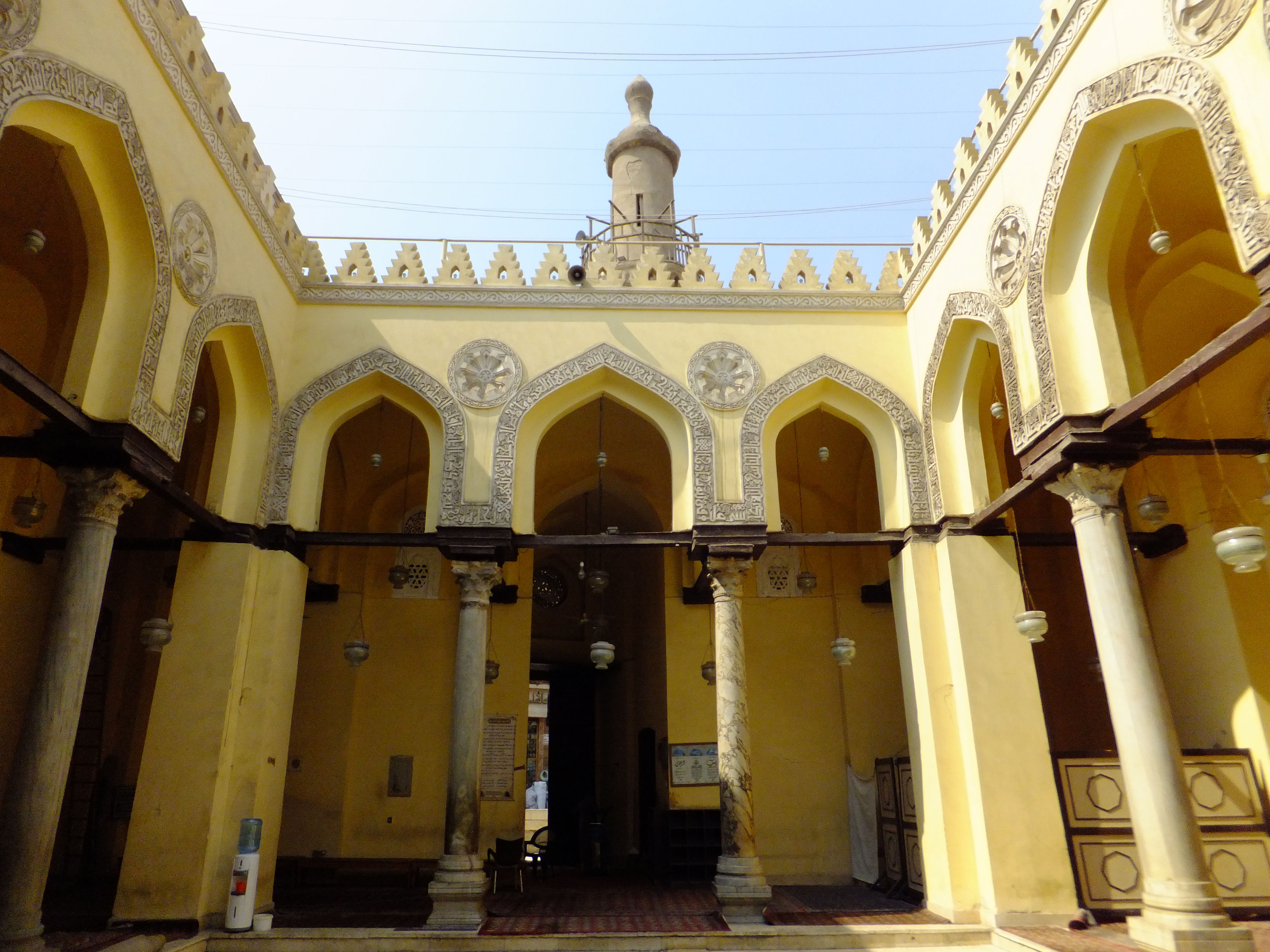
Renovated interior courtyard, looking towards the entrance and the minaret

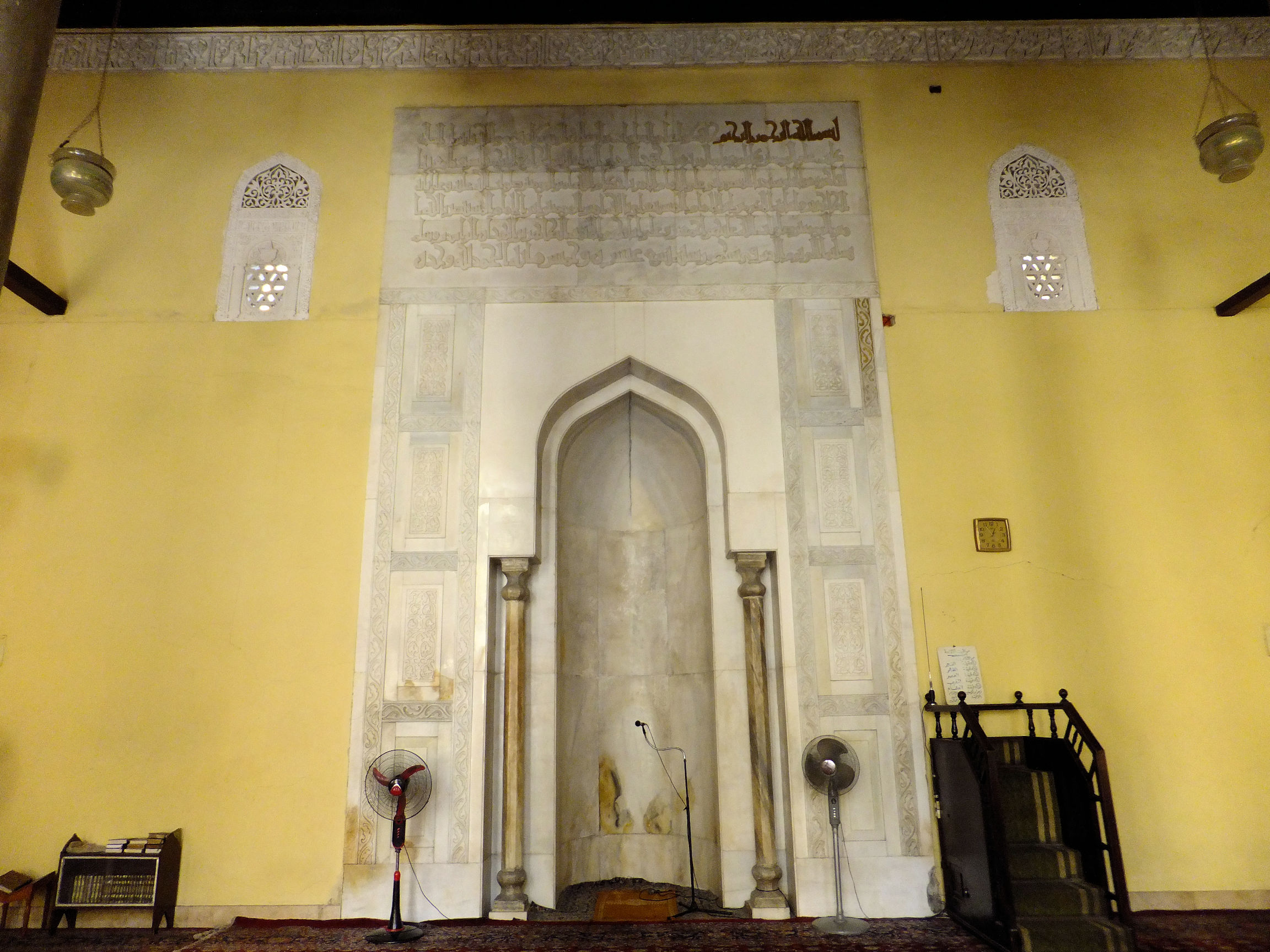
Renovated marble mihrab inside the mosque

=== Decoration of the façade ===
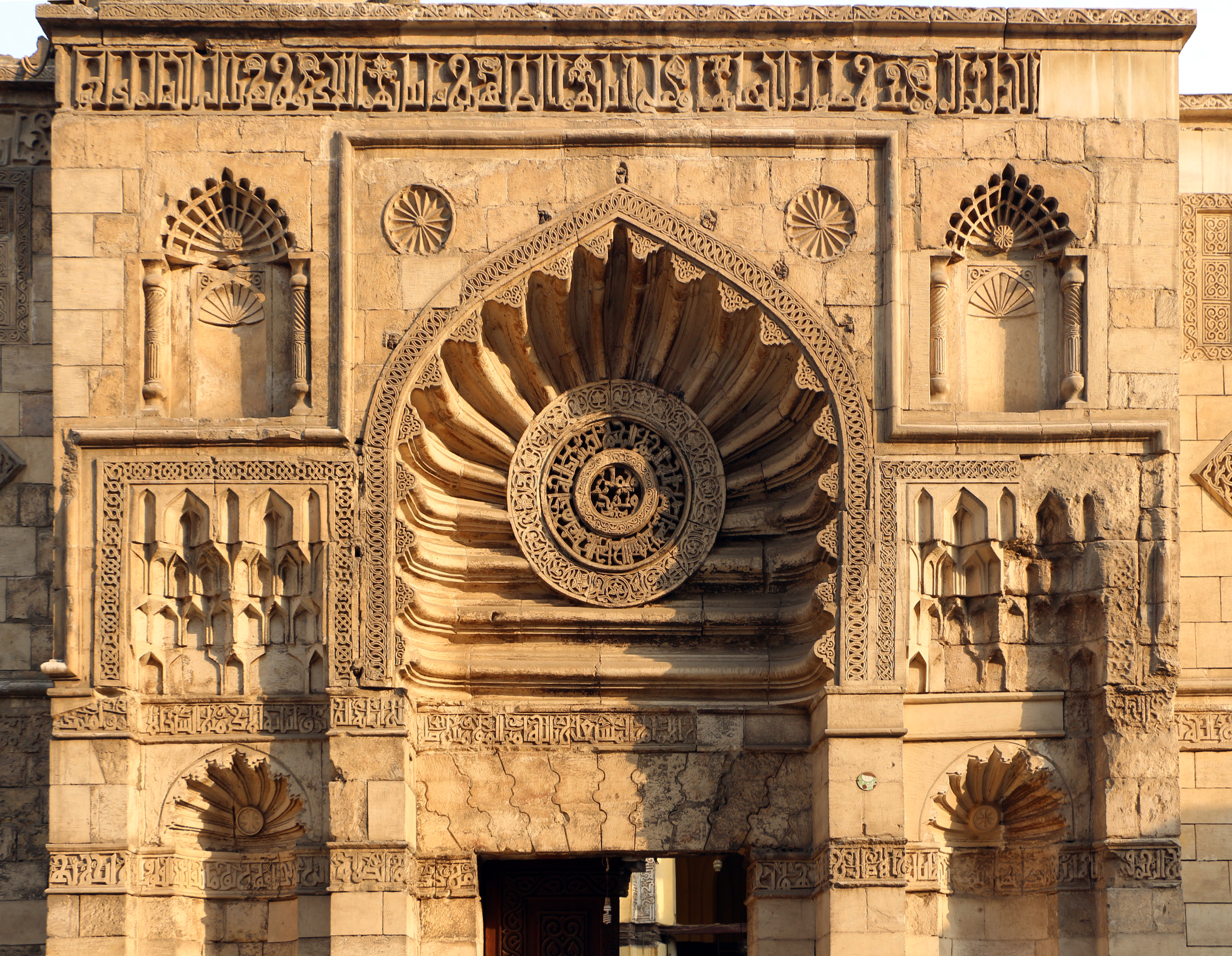
Façade of the mosque (central portion). The remains of the foundation inscription can be seen running along the top.

The mosque of al-Aqmar was the earliest to have lavish decoration across the entire façade. Elements decorating the façade are loaded with symbolic meaning and can be interpreted in various ways. One notable feature is the large medallion in the hood of the main niche above the entrance. This epigraphic medallion is pierced in the form of a grille, which is unique to the decorative repertoire of architectural façades in Cairo. "Muhammad and 'Ali" take up the center of the medallion surrounded by a Qur’anic inscription. The Qur’anic inscription around the medallion starts on the lower right side, stating:

“In the name of Allah, the Beneficent, the Merciful, O People of the House [ahl al-bayt] God only desires to put away from you abomination and with cleansing to cleanse you.”

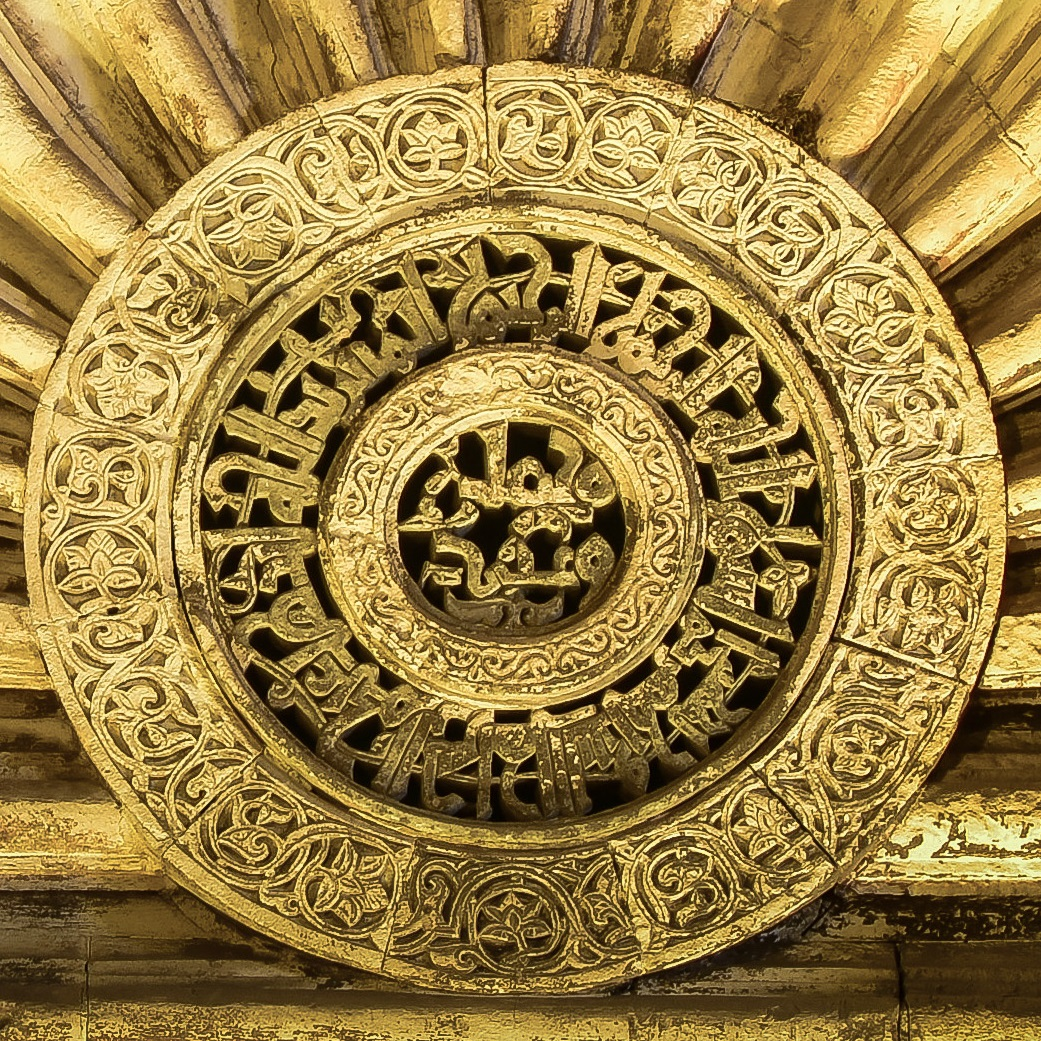
Pierced medallion with inscriptions, in the center of the façade

The Fatimids interpreted this Qur’anic inscription as a reference to themselves, using it as a statement of legitimacy and manifestation of Shi'i ideology. The last few words of the inscriptions are cramped and placed on a new line, which indicates that the ratio of space to words was miscalculated.

The façade is divided into a variation of recesses: some, such as the main niche above the entrance, have a scalloped-shell hood with a medallion in the center while others, such as the niches flanking the main entrance niche, have flat muqarnas panels. The left beveled corner, topped by a muqarnas niche with the names of Muhammad and 'Ali, was designed to facilitate traffic turning around the corner, another feature unique to Cairo.

The combination of Mohammad and Ali is further prominent in the decoration of the left half of the façade, here name of Ali is in center and encircled by five linked Muhammad. The extravagantly decorated façade is what makes this mosque the major architectural monument of its time. The right side of the portal was later covered by another building and its current state is a modern restoration and reconstruction by the Bohras, hence the stone's lighter color and smoother texture in comparison with the original masonry of the rest of the façade.

Other carved images offer more abstract symbols. To the very left of the façade, there is a window grille framed by an arch resting on two small columns with the Muslim profession of faith above and roundels filling the spandrels in the names of Muhammad and 'Ali. The grille is formed of a radiating six-pointed star with a lamp hanging in the center. One scholarly claim argues that this window represents a mihrab (prayer niche), similar to a flat stucco mihrab found in the Mosque of Ibn Tulun; however, the mihrab referred to has a star hanging from a chain and not a lamp. A more plausible argument proposed by another scholar is that the window represents a shubbāk, the grille from which the caliph appeared to the public on Fatimid ceremonial occasions, specifically symbolizing a famous grille taken by the Fatimids from the palace of their Abbasid rivals in Baghdad and placed as an emblem of victory in the neighboring palace.

Near the grilled window, on the same side of the façade, are carved panels representing doors. One possible interpretation of the doors is in reference to the famous Shi'i hadith: "I am the city of knowledge and 'Ali is its gate". The carved panels could also have a political interpretation rather than a religious one, representing the doors of the caliph's court (Bab al-Majlis) in connection with the official role of the mosque's founder, al-Ma'mun al-Bata'ihi, as master of the door (Sahib al-Bab); thereby symbolizing the Fatimid vizier's function in governing who had access to the caliph. Although the grilled window and the carved door panels represent real objects, their particular use as part of the façade's decorative scheme grants them a metaphorical meaning associated with the historical framework of Fatimid caliphal rituals.

Between the carved image of the window and of the doors there was once a decorative roundel or medallion which was later cut out and removed at some later unknown date, leaving the brickwork of the wall exposed. The 1990s restoration filled in this empty space with a rosette, hiding the brickwork once again. Scholar Doris Behrens-Abouseif has suggested that the original roundel was removed because it conveyed a message or concept that was later deemed unorthodox, or because it because it contained an inscription glorifying al-Ma'mun which the caliph resented after the vizier's arrest.

Lastly, the main foundation inscription of the mosque runs along the top of the façade, directly below the cornice of the building. Much of the inscription is missing, but what still survives mentions the reigning caliph al-Amir, his father al-Musta'li, and the vizier al-Bata'ihi. It translates as follows:

(Basmala, has ordered its construction ... the servant of our lord and master the imam al-Amir bi-ahkam Allah the son of the imam al-Musta'li) Bi'llah, commander of the faithful, may God's prayers be upon them and upon their pure and honourable ascendants, and their pious descendants, seeking the favour of God, the King, the Generous...O God, give victory to the armies of the imam al-Amir bi-ahkam Allah, commander of the faithful, over all the infid(els.....the most noble lord, al-Ma'mun amir of the armies, sword of Islam, defender of the imam), protector of the judges of the Muslims and the director of the missionaries of the believers, Abu 'Abd Allah Muhammad (servant of) al-Amir, may God strengthen religion for him, may He make the commander of the faithful enjoy long life, may He perpetuate his power and elevate his word, in the year 519 [1125-6]."

The name of the reigning caliph's father, al-Mustaʿli, is placed in the center of the inscription frieze above the entrance door for maximum exposure. While the inscriptions of the upper band are carved in relief with floriated letters, the lower band of inscriptions are plain, relatively small in size with flat letters and a floriated stem in the background.

Details of the façade

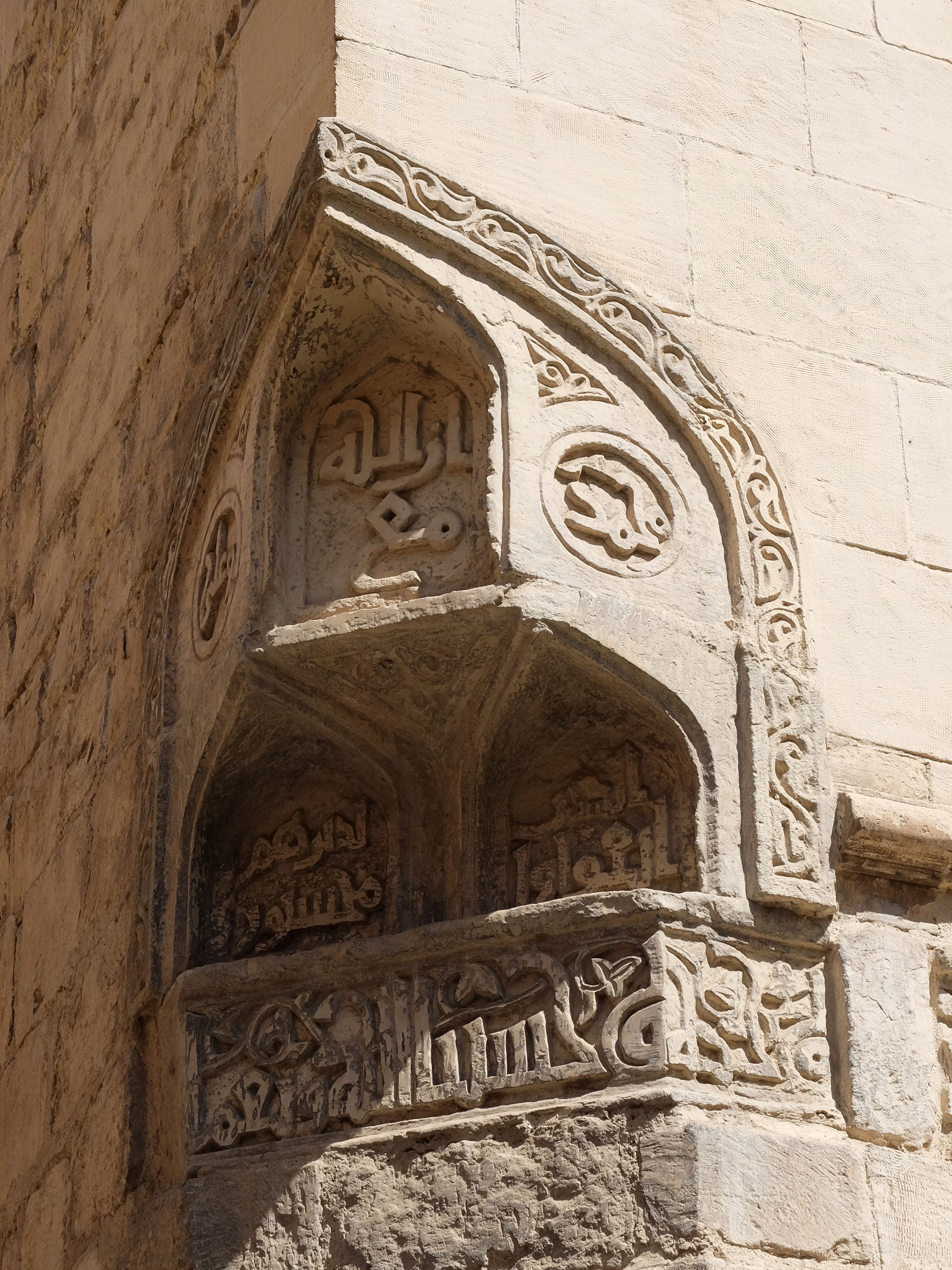
Beveled or chamfered corner of the mosque with three muqarnas niches

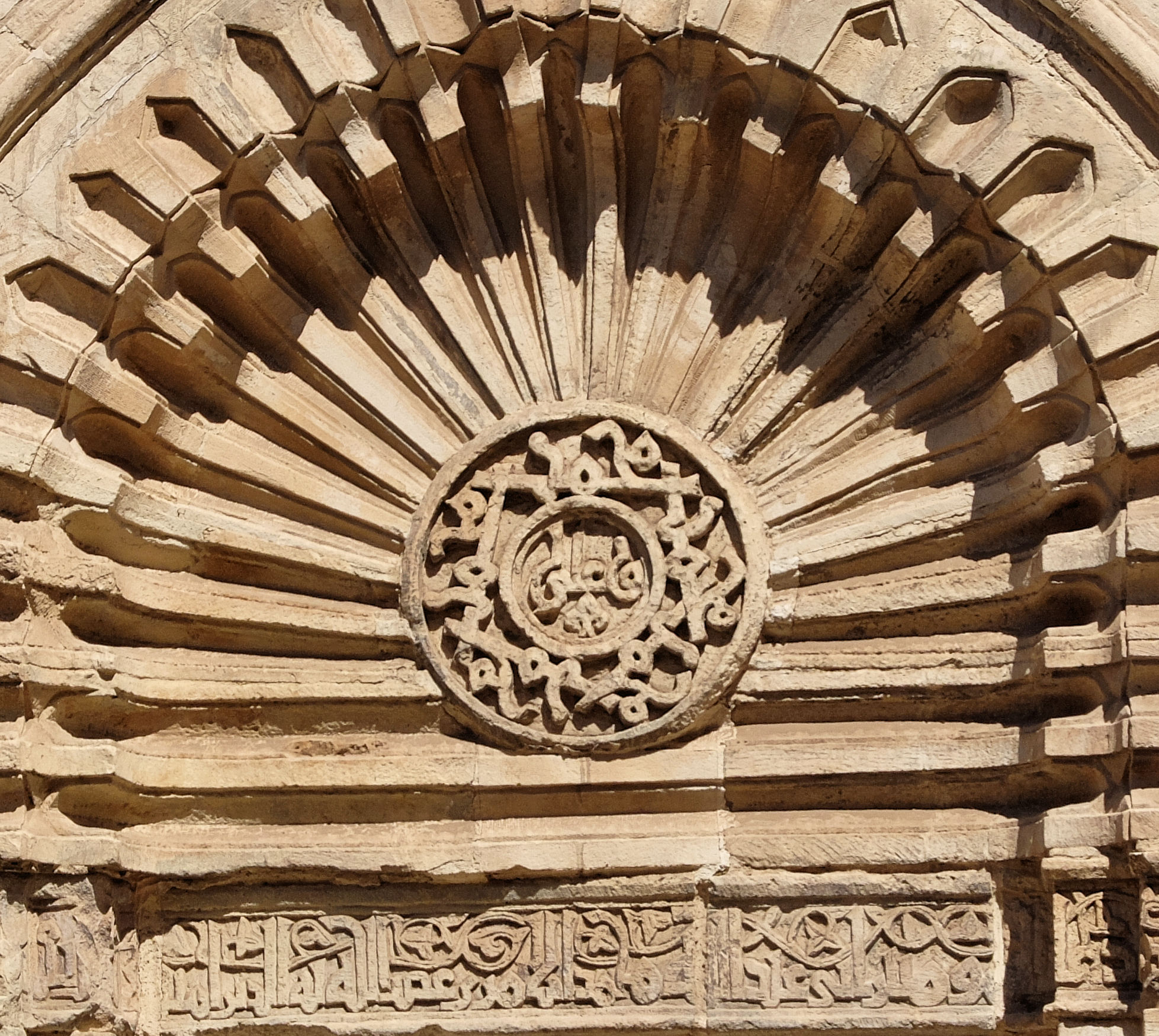
Carved medallion on the left-side façade, with an inscription of the name "Muhammad" chained together five times around the name "Ali" in the middle

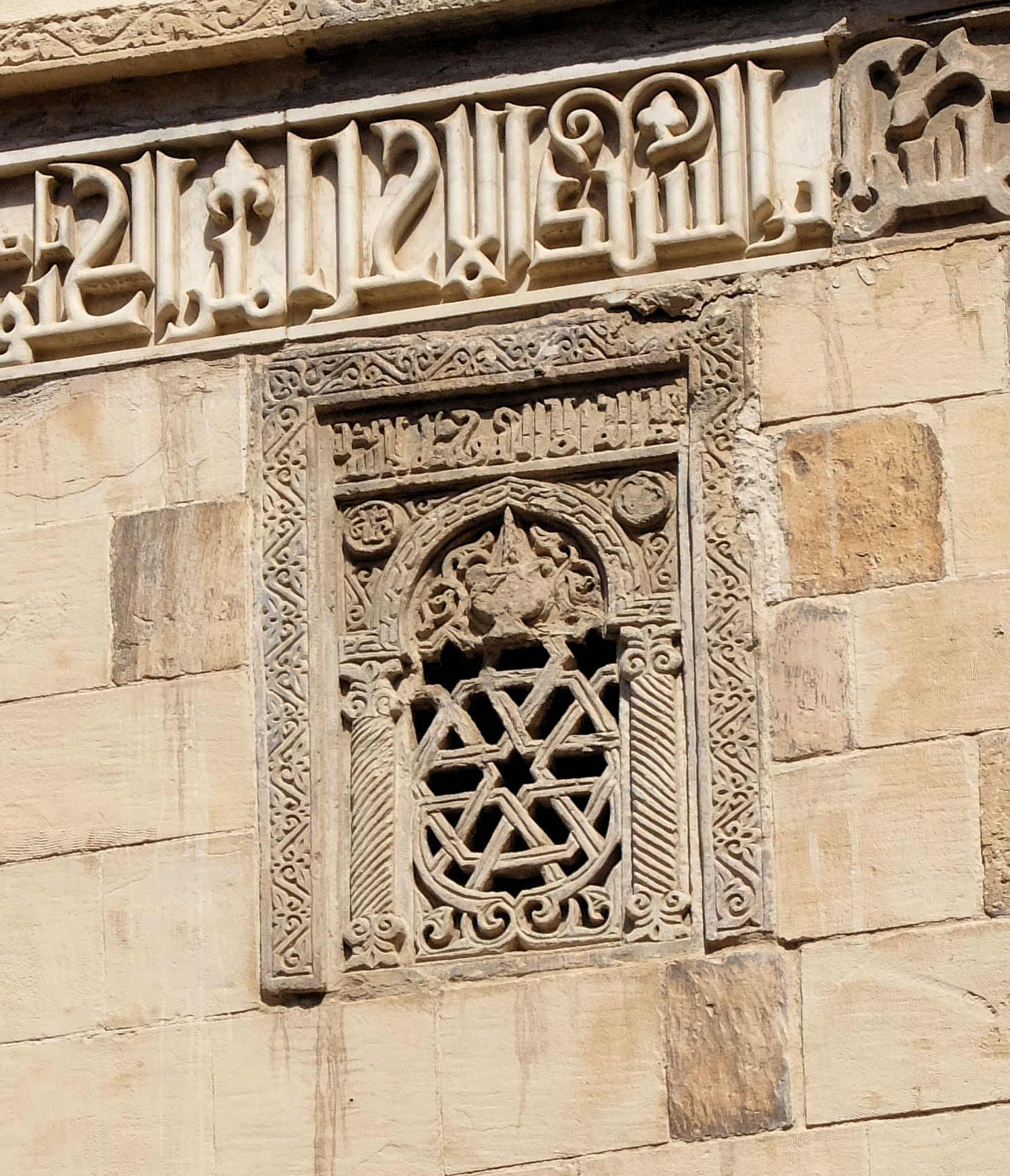
Original image of window and lamp carved in stone on the left-side façade

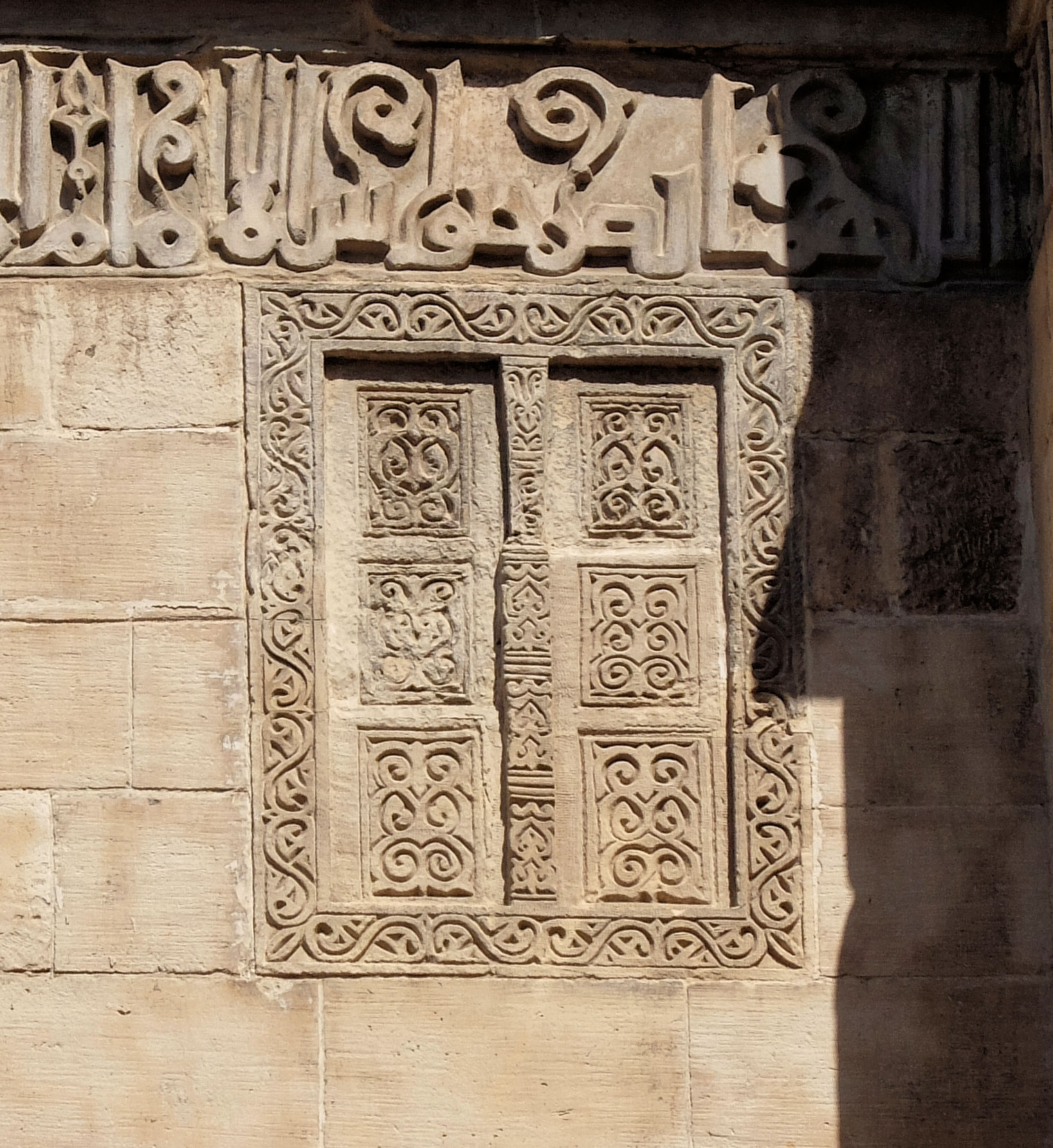
Original carved image of doors, on the left-side façade

=== Interior decoration ===
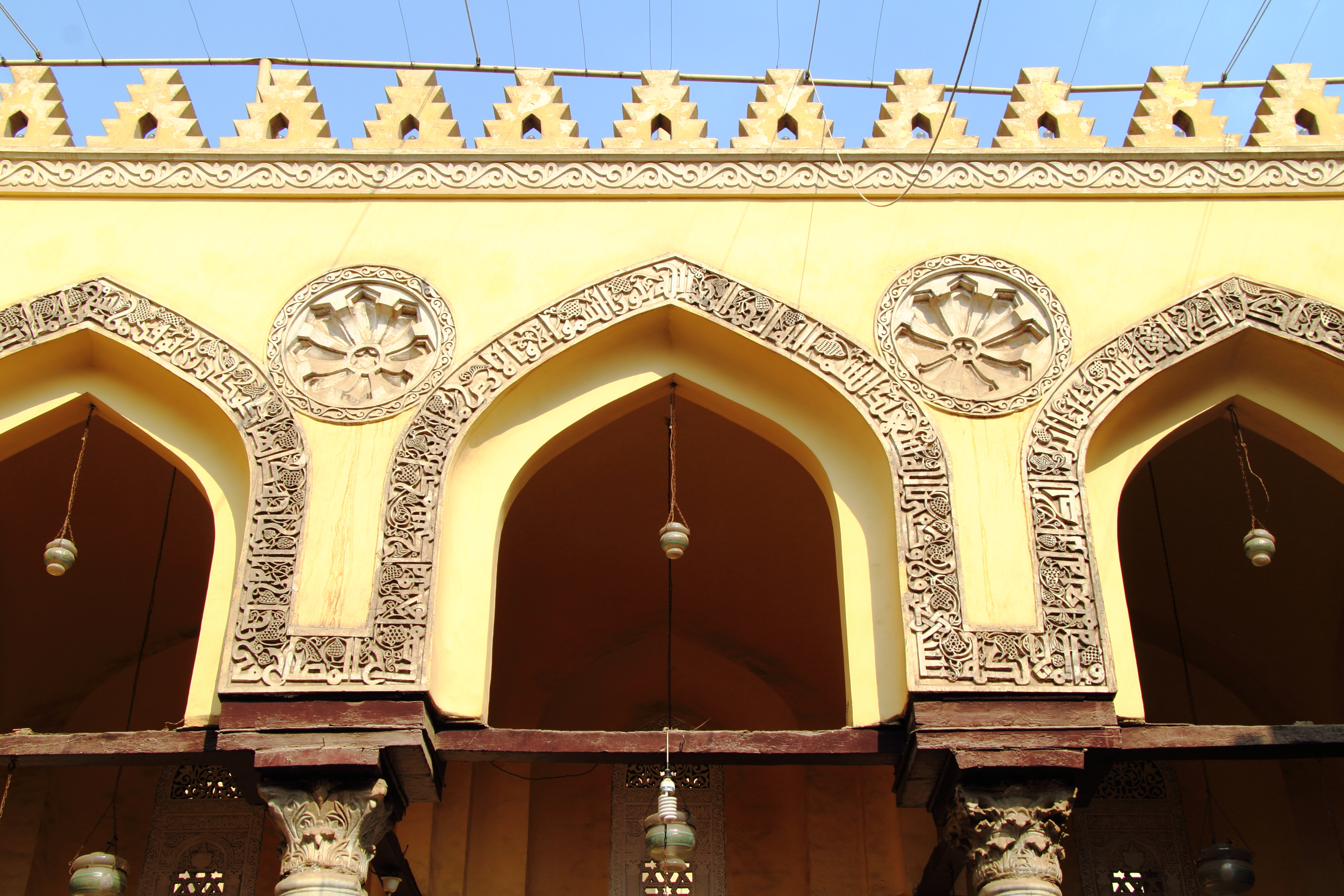
View of the interior decoration of the mosque today

In the mosque's interior courtyard, a band of Kufic inscriptions with a floriated background runs around the arches along the courtyard. Aside from some of the Kufic inscriptions and some of the carved wooden tie-beams between the arches, most of the mosque's original interior decoration has not been preserved. The mosque's original Fatimid mihrab was replaced during the 14th-century restoration by a Mamluk-style mihrab with marble paneling, however the 1990s Bohra restoration replaced this too with the current modern marble creation.

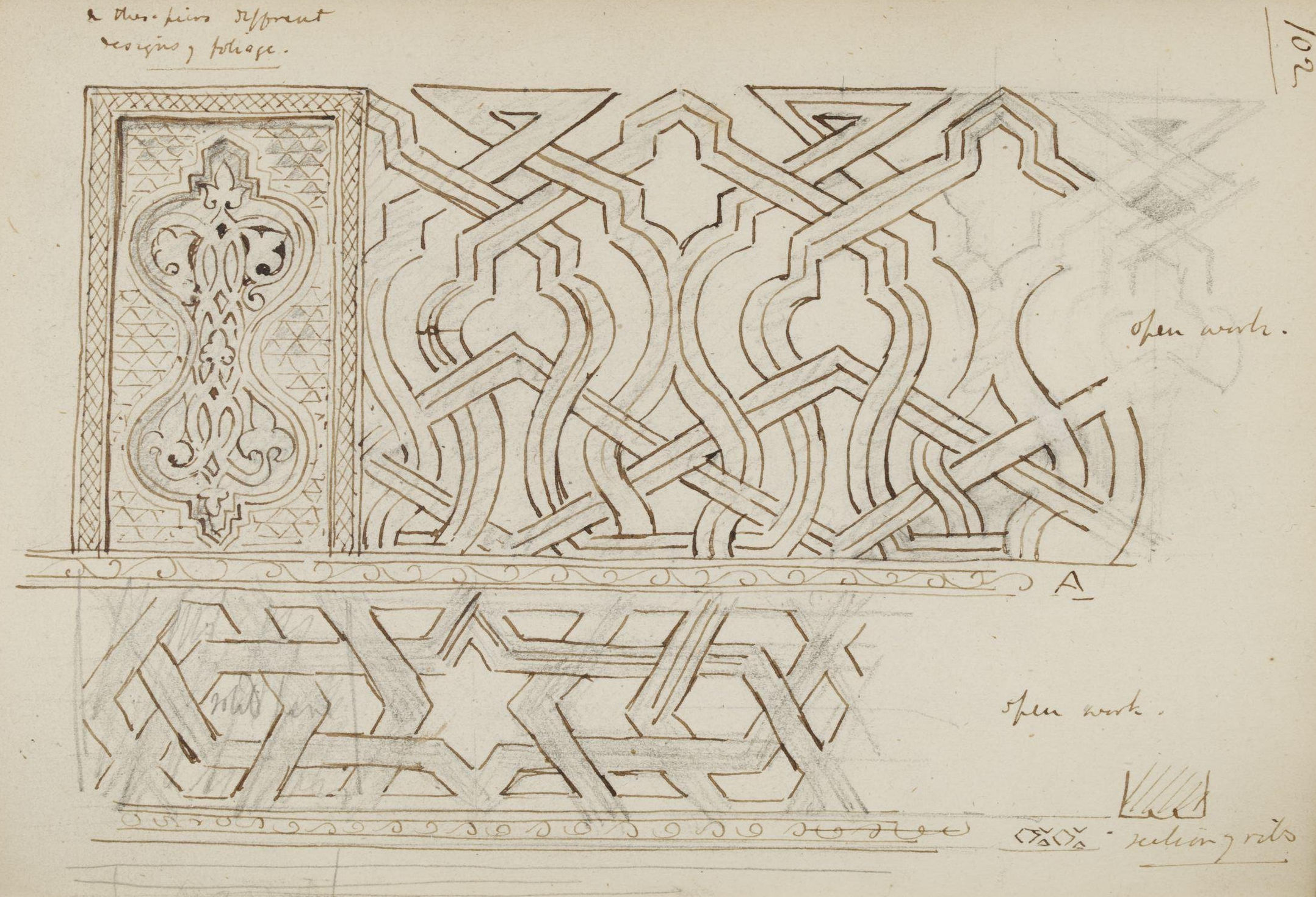
Drawing of the courtyard's original decorative crenellations, by James Wild (1840s)

The simple stepped crenellations seen around the top edge of the courtyard today were also added by the Bohra restoration. The original decorative crenellations had disappeared by the early 20th century, but were recorded in drawings made by English architect James Wild in the 1840s. They were executed in openwork and consisted of two elements: a lower band with a geometric motif similar to the equivalent openwork added by al-Hafiz to the courtyard of Al-Azhar Mosque, and a wider upper band featuring an interlacing motif similar to the stucco-carved motifs at the top of the Fatimid-era mihrab in the Mashhad of Sayyida Ruqayya.

=== Minaret ===
The minaret was added later by the Mamluk amir Yalbugha al-Salimi as part of his restorations in 1393 or 1397. Only the lower part of al-Salimi's minaret survives, which is built of brick covered in stucco, topped with stone muqarnas, convex molding below, and a band of carved arabesques interrupted by openwork bosses in the middle. The upper part of the minaret by al-Salimi fell in 1412 and was replaced by a cylindrical finial most likely during the Ottoman period.

== See also ==
- Islam in Egypt
- List of mosques in Cairo
- List of mosques in Egypt
- List of Historic Monuments in Cairo
