= Hammam of Sultan Inal =

Hammam in Cairo

Coordinates: 30°03′1.9″N 31°15′40.4″E

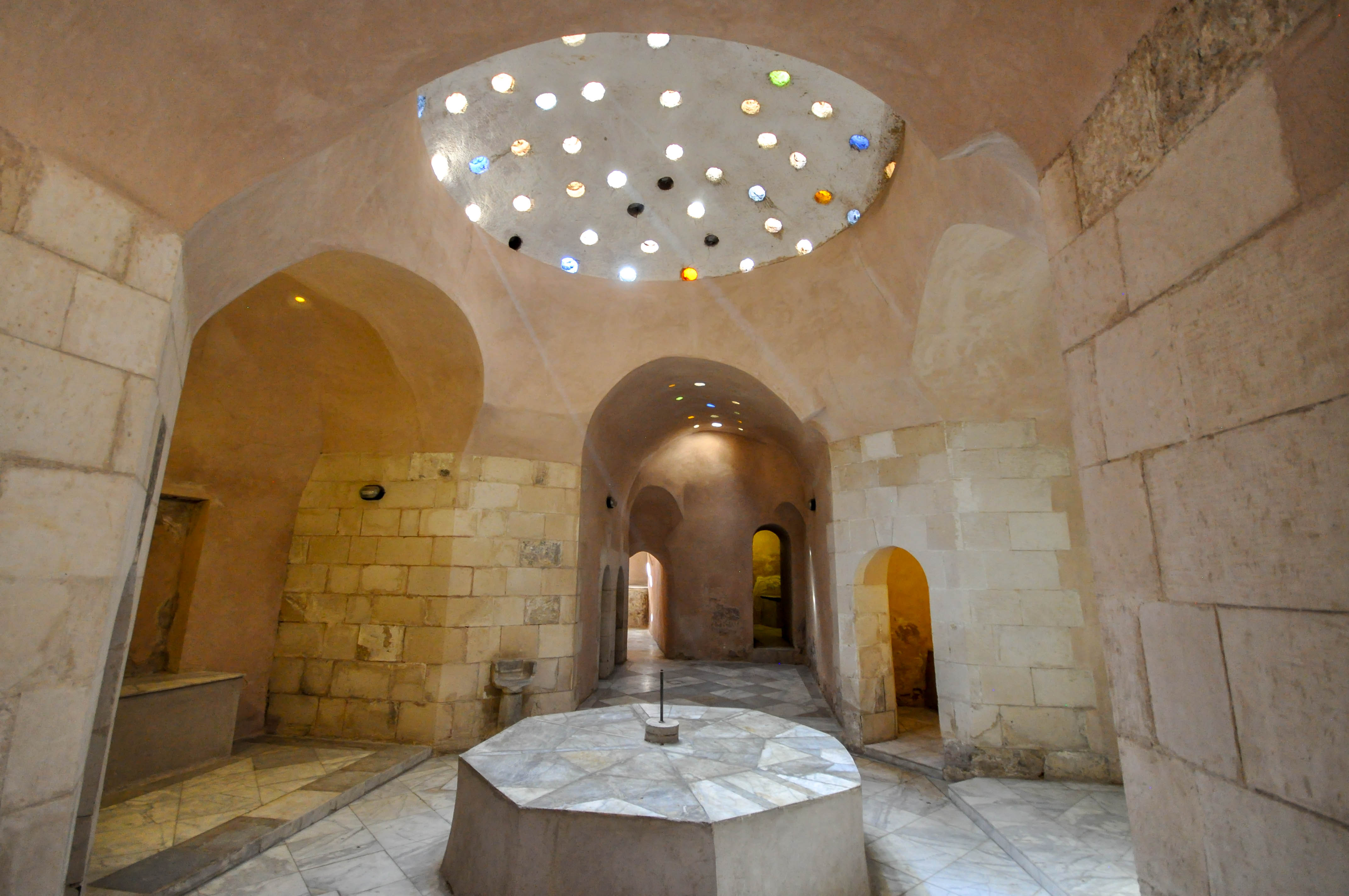
Inside the hot room (bayt al-harara) of the hammam

The Hammam of Sultan Inal is a historic hammam (public bathhouse) in Cairo, Egypt. It is located in the Bayn al-Qasrayn area, on al-Mu'izz street, in the historic center of Cairo. The hammam was commissioned by Sultan Inal and built in 1456, during the Mamluk period. It is one of the few well-preserved hammams in Cairo out of the nearly 80 that existed by the end of the 19th century. It recently underwent a multi-year restoration and is now open to visitors as a historic monument.

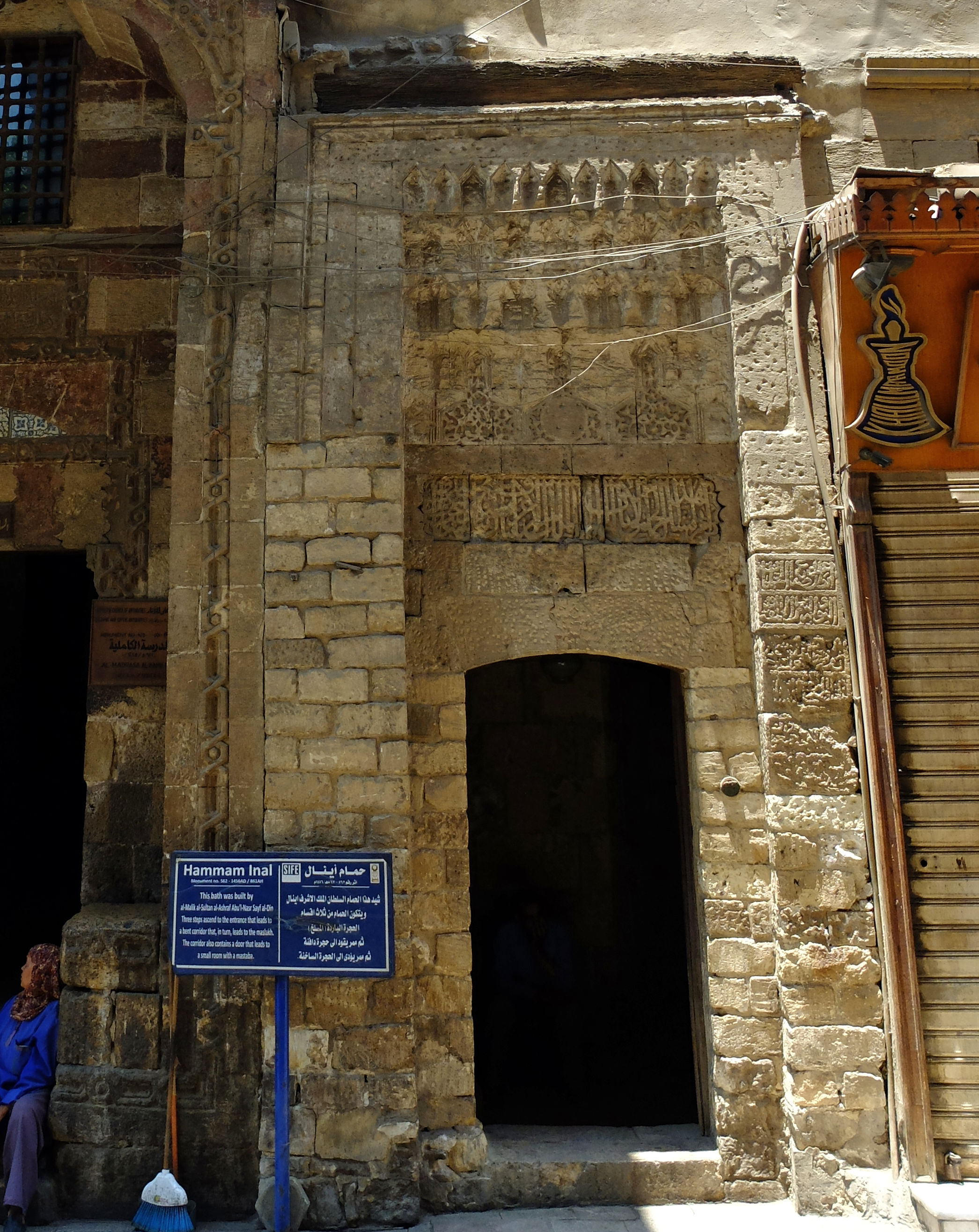
Entrance to the hammam on al-Muizz street

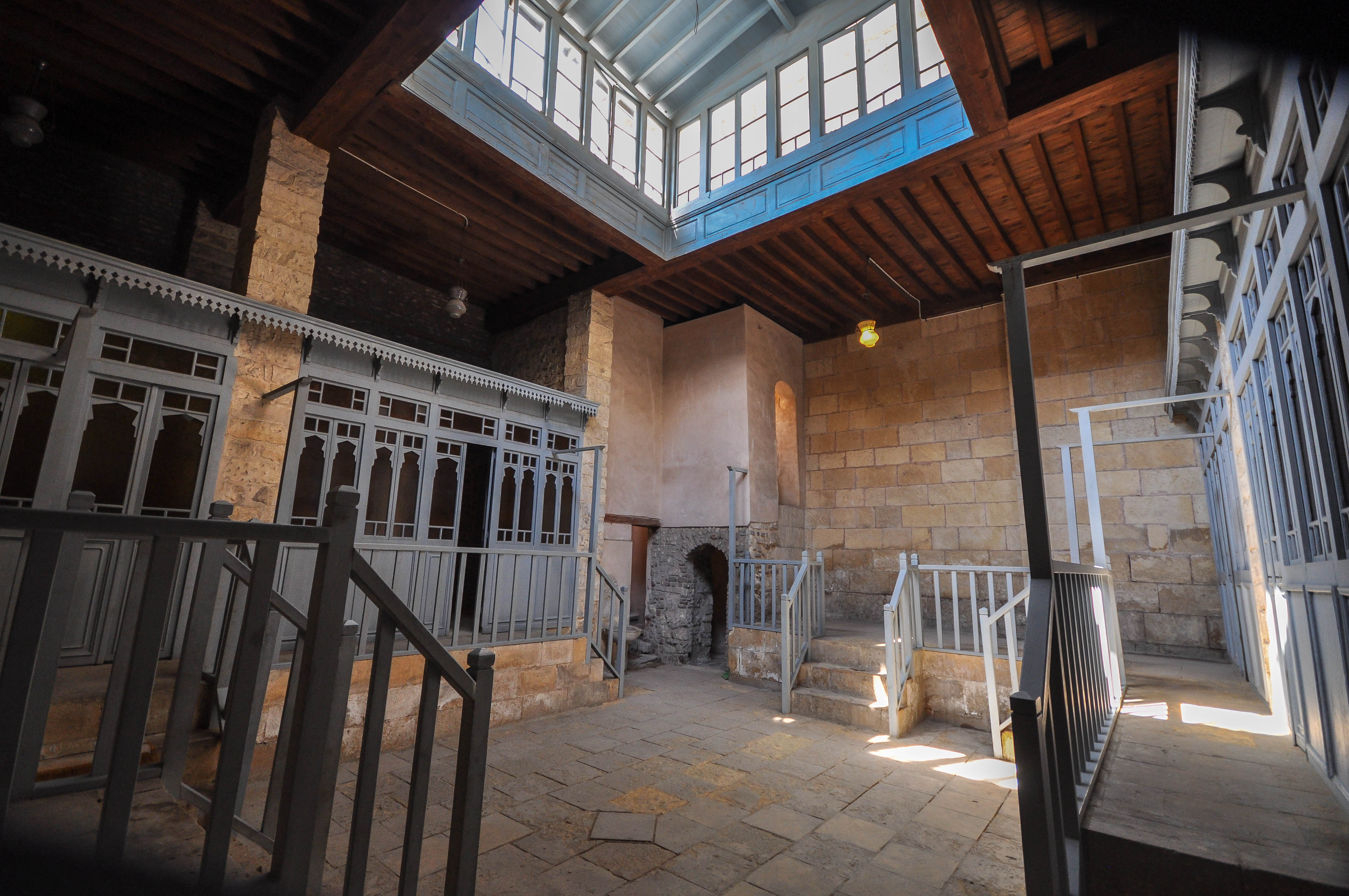
The changing room of the hammam
