= Mosque-Sabil of Sulayman Agha al-Silahdar =

Mosque in Cairo, Egypt

- مسجد وكتاب وسبيل سليمان أغا السلحدار
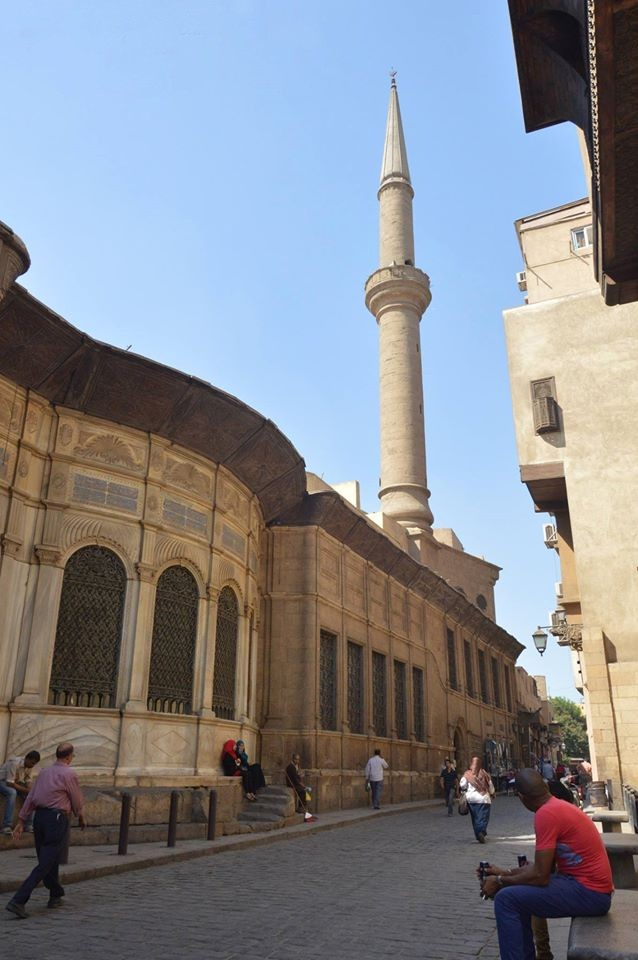
- View from Muizz Street

Religion
- Affiliation: Islam
- Ecclesiastical or organisational status: Mosque
- Status: Active

Location
- Location: Muizz Street, Islamic Cairo
- Country: Egypt
- Interactive map of Mosque-Sabil of Sulayman Agha al-Silahdar
- Coordinates: 30°03′09″N 31°15′43″E

Architecture
- Type: Mosque
- Style: Islamic; Ottoman
- Completed: 1839

Specifications
- Dome: 1
- Minaret: 1

The Mosque-Sabil of Sulayman Agha al-Silahdar, also known as the Mosque-Sabil-Kuttab of Sulayman Agha al-Silahdar (Arabic: مسجد وكتاب وسبيل سليمان أغا السلحدار), is an Islamic religious complex that contains a mosque, sabil, and kuttab, located at the beginning of Burjouan alley of the famed Muizz Street, in Islamic Cairo, Egypt. The complex was established in 1839 CE, during the era of Muhammad Ali Pasha. On the other side it faces the extension of Al-Nahasin Street leading to the Bab Al-Shaareya square.

== Architecture ==
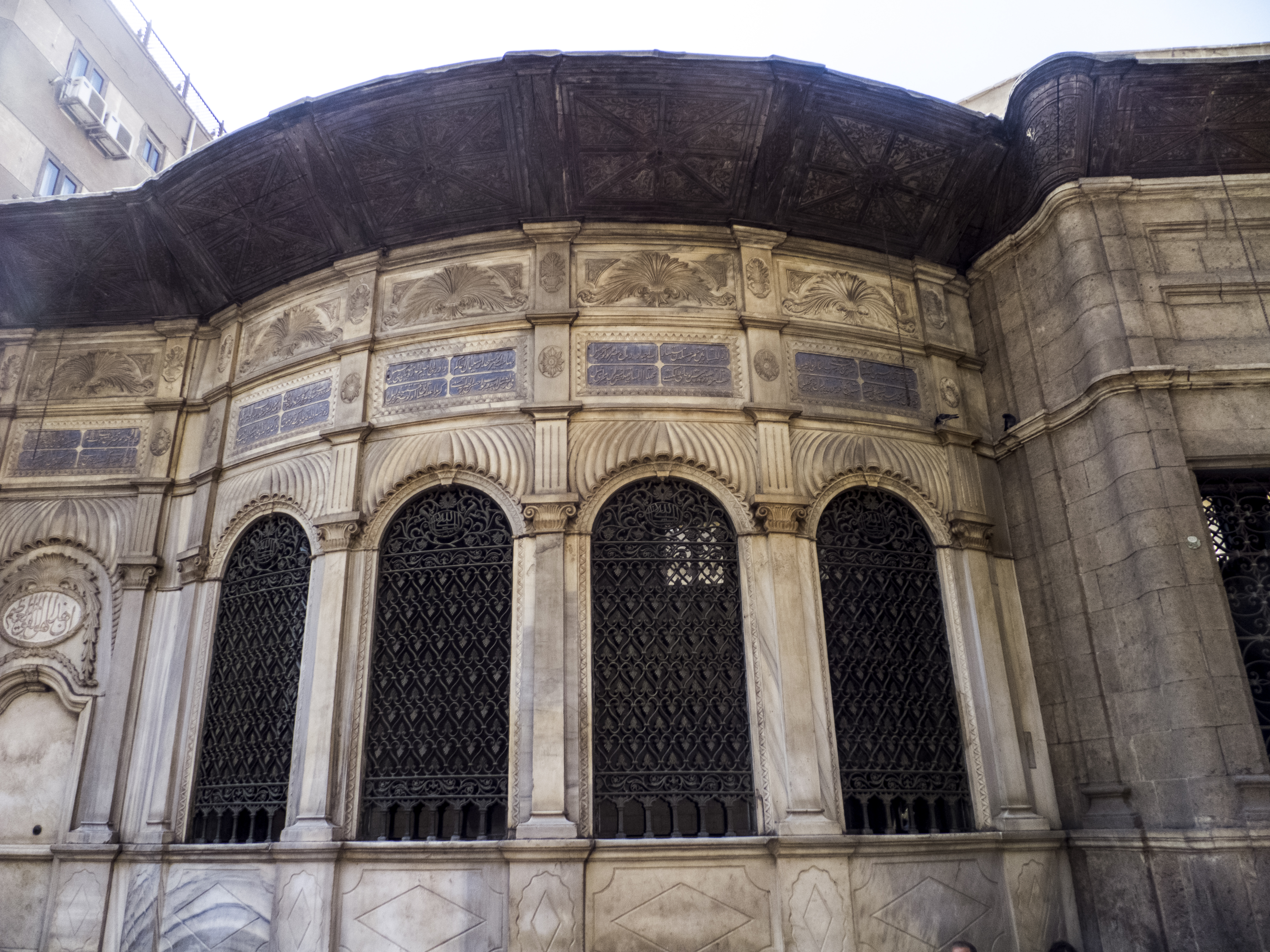
Close-up of the sabil.

The mosque consists of a rectangle divided into two sections. The western section contains the sanctuary area of the mosque and a sahn which is surrounded by a four-sided hallway covered by small domes built on marble pillars. Each dome is decorated with multicolored oil paintings with floral and geometric patterns and Quranic inscriptions. The sahn is covered by a wooden roof with a center opening for ventilation, lighting and protection of the mosque from rain. The eastern section contains a prayer room and consists of two pillars, each of which contains two marble columns. The two sections divide the place of prayer into three corridors parallel to the qibla wall. The place of prayer is covered by a wooden ceiling decorated with multicolored oil paintings. The qibla wall is in the prayer room and a marble mihrab can be found in its center.

The mosque was renovated in 2015 by the grandson of Suleiman Agha al-Silahdar.

The sabil is located next to the adjacent kuttab. It is adorned with Ottoman Baroque style facade strongly resembles that of Sabil of Ismail Pasha.

=== Interior ===
The mosque's interior tends to be divided into two sections and the sections are divided in a form of a rectangular structure. The mosque is a focal ideal of the Ottoman style architecture which depicts the style of the characteristics of the Muhammad Ali architectural design. The facade consists of floral designs in which replicates the European Renaissance architecture, and so are the granite structures which consists of oil paintings throughout the interior of the ceilings. The ornamental architecture of the facade of Sabil Sulyiman Agha Al-Silahadar is made of white marble and is embellished with Turkish calligraphy that reflects the Ottoman style. In terms of the sabil, it was formed of marble, which was used to keep the temperature of the water cool.

The outside area of the shattered forum structure is disguised with the shallow arches in the Ottoman architectural style. Just above the entrance of the mosque there is a tiny round balcony. The sacred structure of the roof is supported by various identical marbled walls that construct three columns corresponding to the qibla wall. The Dika is a form of artwork that involves the wooden archways that are above the entryway, interacting with the small spherical rooftop on the outside. The Columns of the interior of the mosque is surrounded by oblong windows that reflects the natural lighting in the inside coming from the courtyard. The inside of the interior of the dome consisted of the different designs of the flowers in which had the Qur'anic inscriptions.

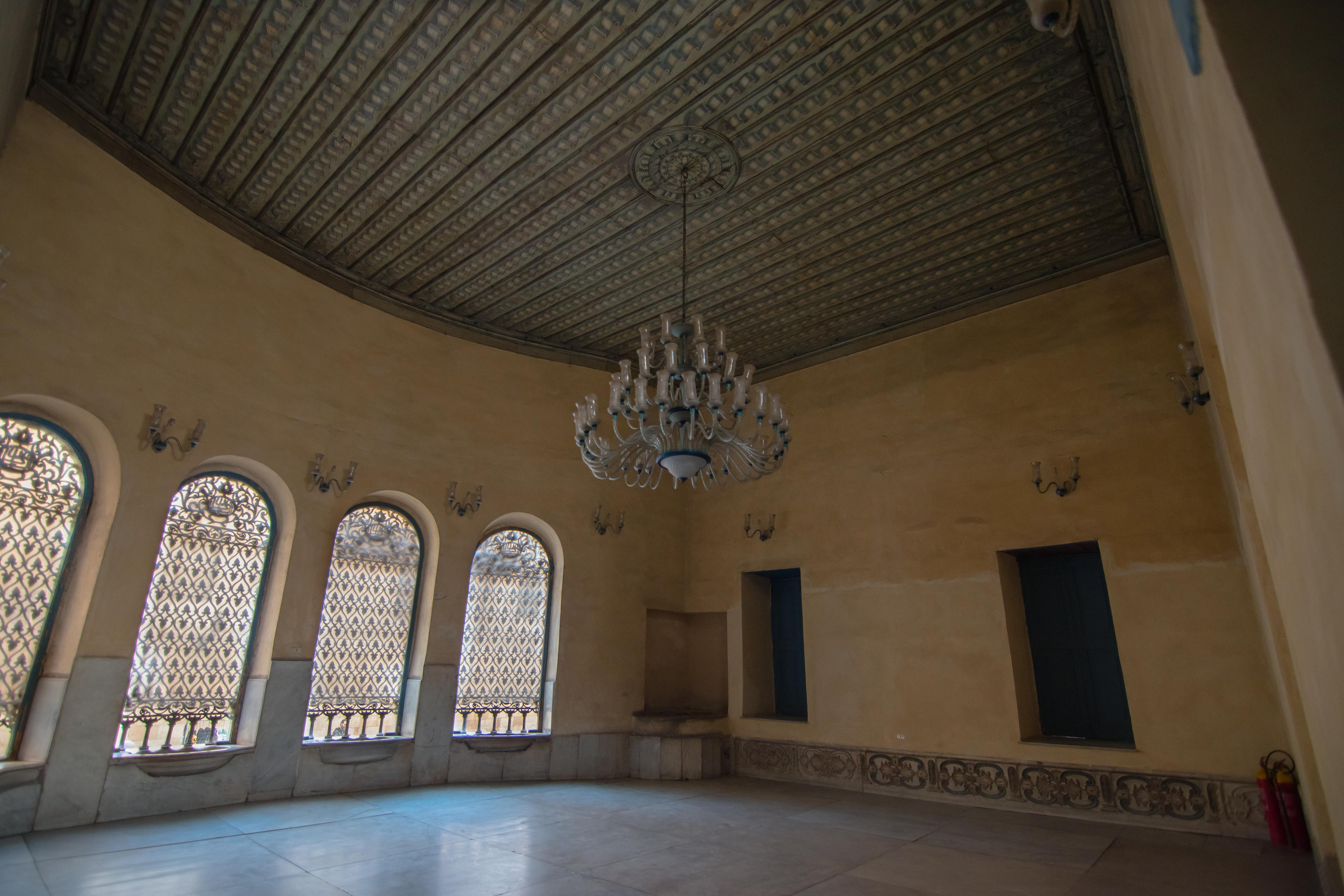
This is the interior of the mosque, which shows the natural lighting, depicted as coming from the sahn

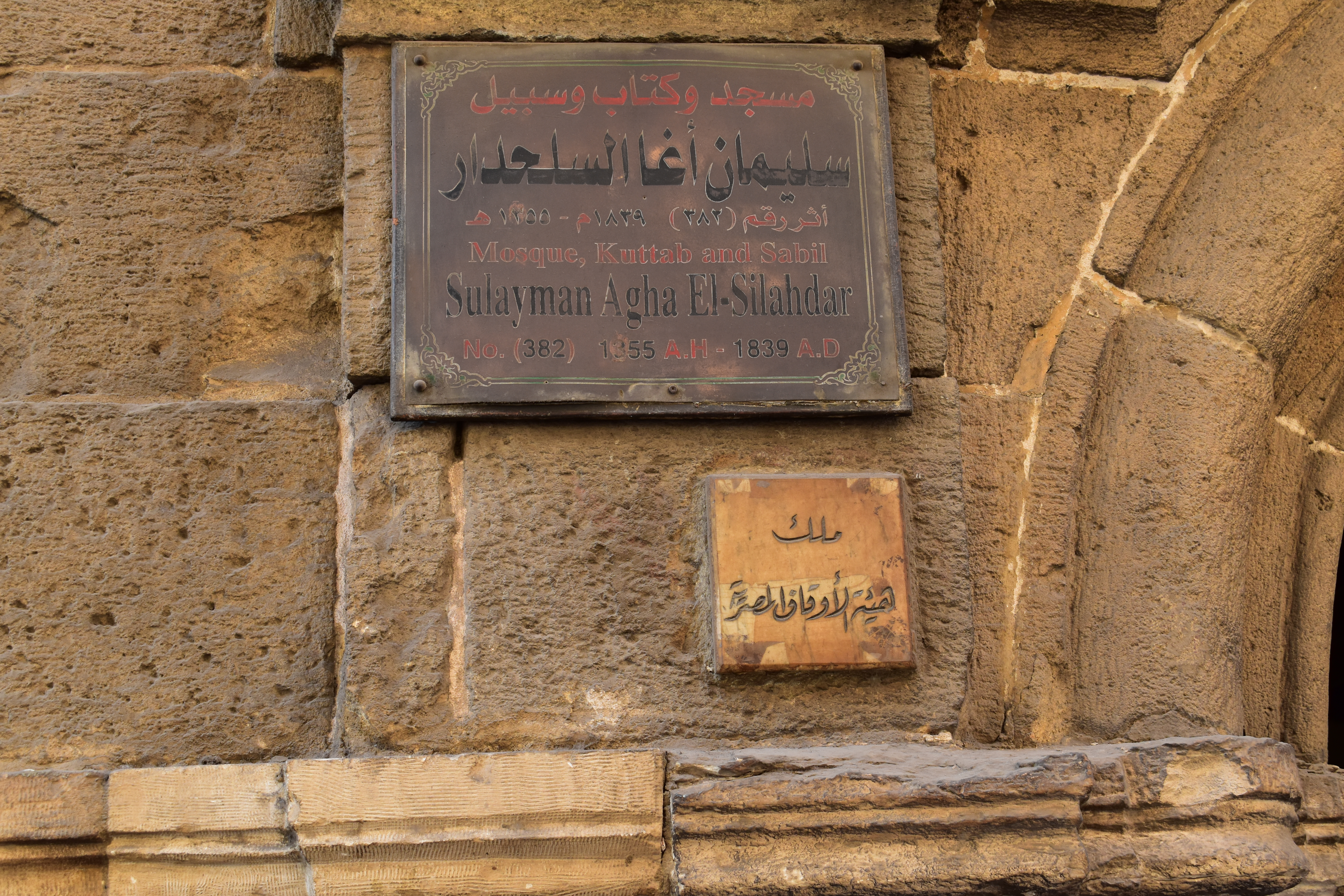
The exterior of the mosque, a sign of the kuttab, and was the name of the mosque

=== Exterior ===
The exterior of the mosque is characterised by the sabil, a charity fountain that was developed to provide free water to walkers seeking to get close to god in Islam. The sabil was constructed on busy streets and not residential streets for a reason: to provide a huge proportion of the people passing by which provides a better use of the sabil. The sabil had an entry on the outside that was different from the mosque's entry. For example, the minaret on the exterior of the Sulayman Agha Al-Silahdar's, "an especially elegant shaft, tall, slender and cylindrical with elongated conical top stands between the madrasa and the mosque." The minaret included a single balcony with longitudinal carvings.

== See also ==
- Islam in Egypt
- List of mosques in Egypt
- List of Historic Monuments in Cairo
