= Inal =

Inal may refer to:

- Inal (name), both a given name and a surname
- Inal Nekh, also known as Inal the Great, a king of Circassia
- Īnāl, a title of the khagan of the Kyrgyz Khaganate
- Inal, Mauritania, a village and rural commune in Mauritania
- İnal, Osmancık, a village in Turkey
- Beylik of İnal, small principality in eastern Anatolia, part of Turkey
- Sayf ad-Din Inal, Mamluk sultan
