= Inan =

Inan can refer to:

- The Arabic women's name ‘Inān, most famously born by the poet ‘Inān bint ‘Abd-Allā
- The Turkish men's name and surname İnan
- Saint Inan, 9th-century Scottish Christian saint
