= Funerary complex of Sultan Qaytbay =

Place of prayer for Muslims in Egypt

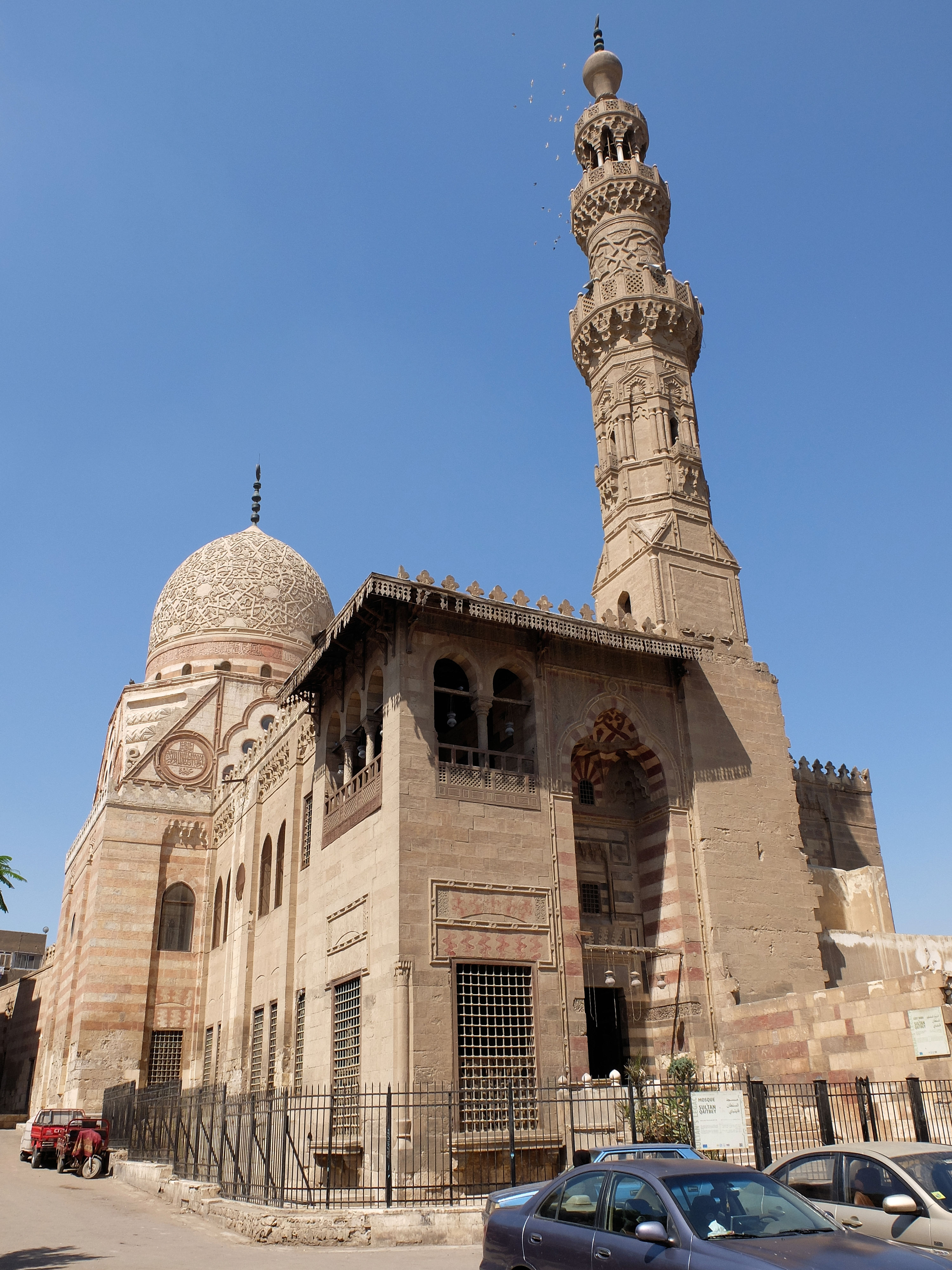

Religion
- Affiliation: Islam
- Ecclesiastical or organisational status: Mosque
- Status: Active

Location
- Location: Northern Cemetery, Cairo
- Country: Egypt
- Interactive map of Funerary complex of Sultan Qaytbay
- Coordinates: 30°02′38″N 31°16′30″E

Architecture
- Type: Madrasa; Mausoleum; Sabil; Kuttab
- Style: late Mamluk
- Founder: Sultan al-Ashraf Abu al-Nasr Qaytbay
- Completed: 1474

Specifications
- Dome: 2
- Minaret: 1

UNESCO World Heritage Site
- Criteria: Cultural: (i)(v)(vi)
- Designated: 1979 (3rd session)
- Part of: Historic Cairo
- Reference no.: 89-005

The funerary complex of Sultan Qaytbay, is an Islamic religious funerary complex located in the Northern Cemetery of Cairo, Egypt. Built by the Mamluk sultan al-Ashraf Qaytbay between 1470 and 1474, the complex consists of a mosque (originally a madrasa) attached to Qaytbay's mausoleum, along with residential structures, a drinking trough for animals, and a smaller tomb. The complex is considered one of the most beautiful and accomplished monuments of late Mamluk architecture and it is pictured on the E£1 banknote.

== History ==
=== Sultan Qaytbay ===
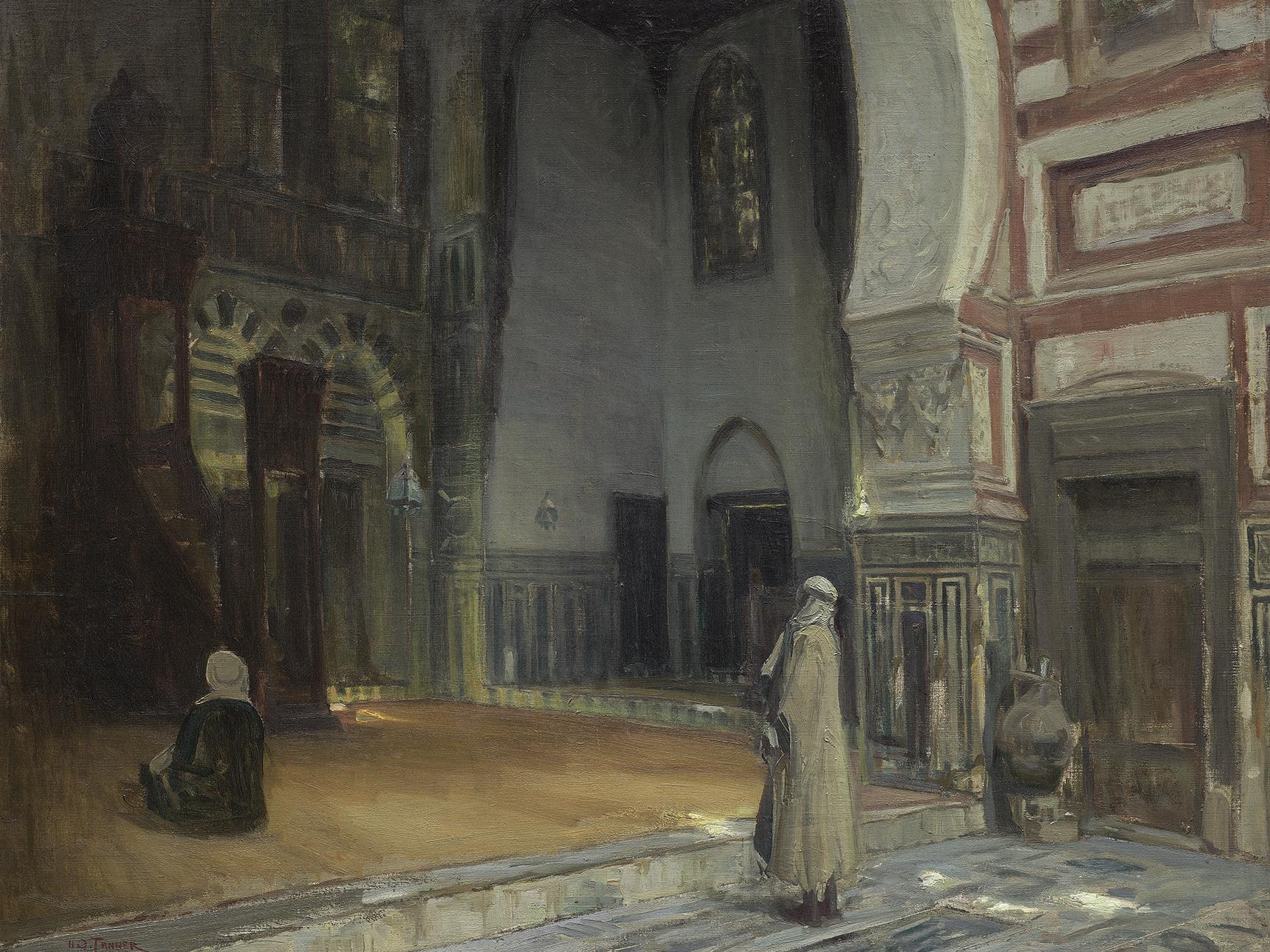
Interior of a Mosque, by Henry Ossawa Tanner (1897), identified by the Museum of Fine Arts, Boston, as the mosque of Qaitbey

Al-Ashraf Qaytbay was a mamluk purchased by Sultan Barsbay (r. 1422–1438) and served under several Mamluk sultans, the last of whom – Sultan al-Zahir Timurbugha (r. 1467–1468) – appointed him amir al-kabir, the commander-in-chief or highest position for an amir under the sultan. Qaytbay succeeded Timurbugha as sultan at the age of 54, and ruled for nearly 29 years from 1468 to 1496, the second-longest reign of any Egyptian Mamluk sultan (after al-Nasir Muhammad). His period was marked by external threats and internal rebellions, notably from the rising Ottomans, which required costly military expeditions, as well as by financial problems.

Nonetheless, Qaytbay is known as an effective ruler who brought long-term stability while in power. He is notable as one of the greatest patrons of architecture in the Mamluk period, particularly of the Burji Mamluk period which was otherwise marked by Egypt's relative decline. He is known for at least 85 structures which he built or restored in Egypt, Syria, Palestine, and Mecca, including 17 in Cairo, and this period is characterized by a refinement of the Mamluk style which included greater decorative detail.

=== Construction and context ===
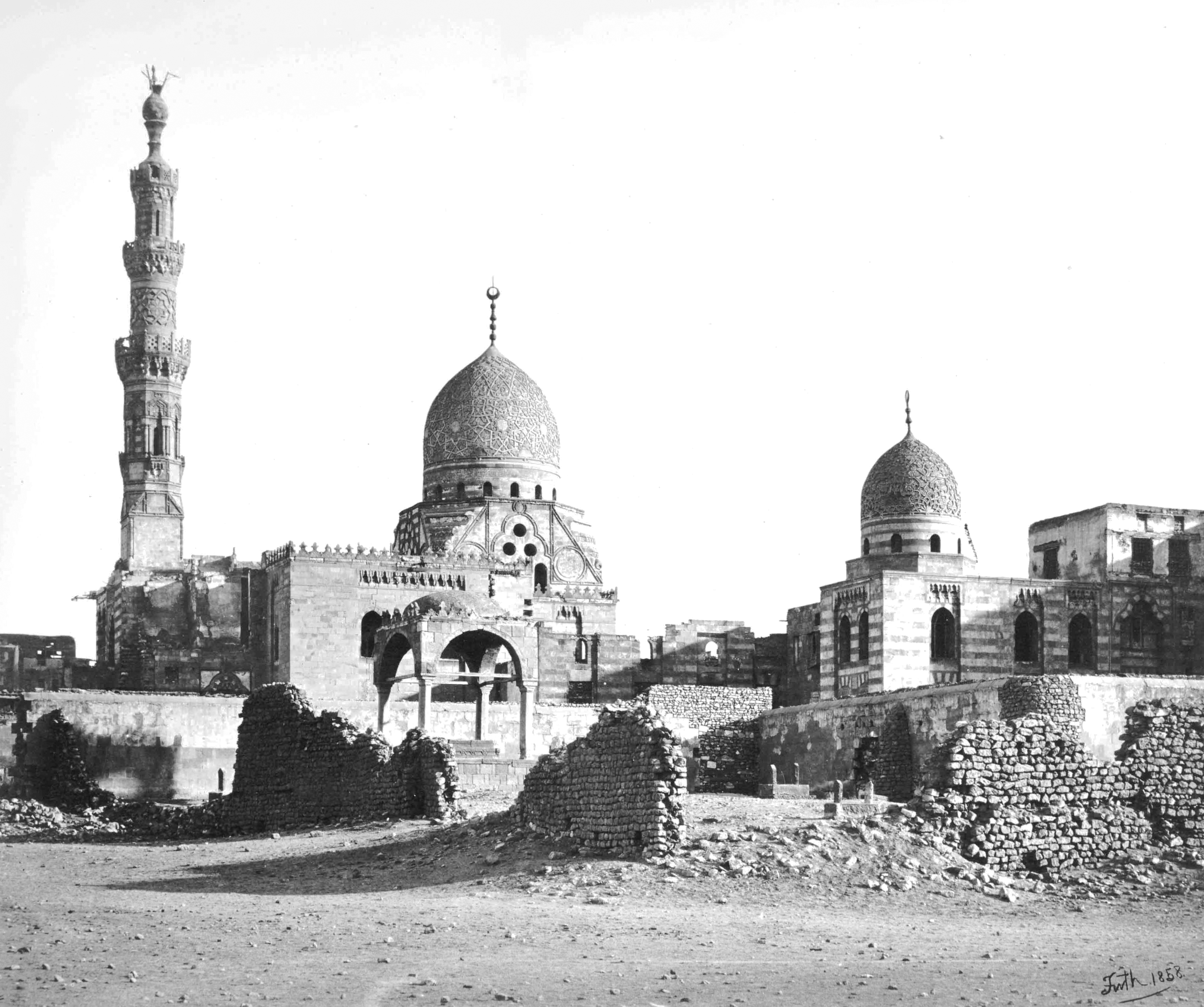
Qaytbay's royal complex in a photo from 1858. Qaytbay's mausoleum is under the dome in the middle. To the right is the smaller dome over what is now Gulshani's tomb.

Qaytbay's funerary complex was one of his earliest architectural commissions; construction work for the complex began in 1470 and the mausoleum was completed in 1474. The construction period was long by Mamluk standards; however, Qaytbay's complex was on a large scale and constituted an entire royal quarter or walled suburb in the then-lightly urbanized desert cemetery area east of Cairo – now known as the Northern Cemetery.

This desert area was developed by the Burji Mamluks in the 15th century as the main southern Qarafa necropolis, not to mention the main city itself, became too full for major new monuments. Major construction projects like Qaytbay's may have been aimed in part at urbanizing this spacious area at the time, though eventually it became mostly an extension of the city's vast cemeteries. Its religious and commercial establishments took advantage of a caravan route which ran through it from Cairo to Mecca in the east and to Syria in the north.

Qaytbay's large complex, like others built by Mamluk amirs and sultans, combined various charitable and commercial functions, which might have contributed to his family's financial future after his death. Qaytbay's mausoleum and complex was also built close to the shrine of the Muslim mystic 'Abd Allah al-Manafi, over whose tomb Qaytbay built a new dome in 1474. This may have influenced his decision to appoint a shaykh of the Maliki madhhab to his mosque, which was unusual for Mamluk institutions.

19th-century images of the complex

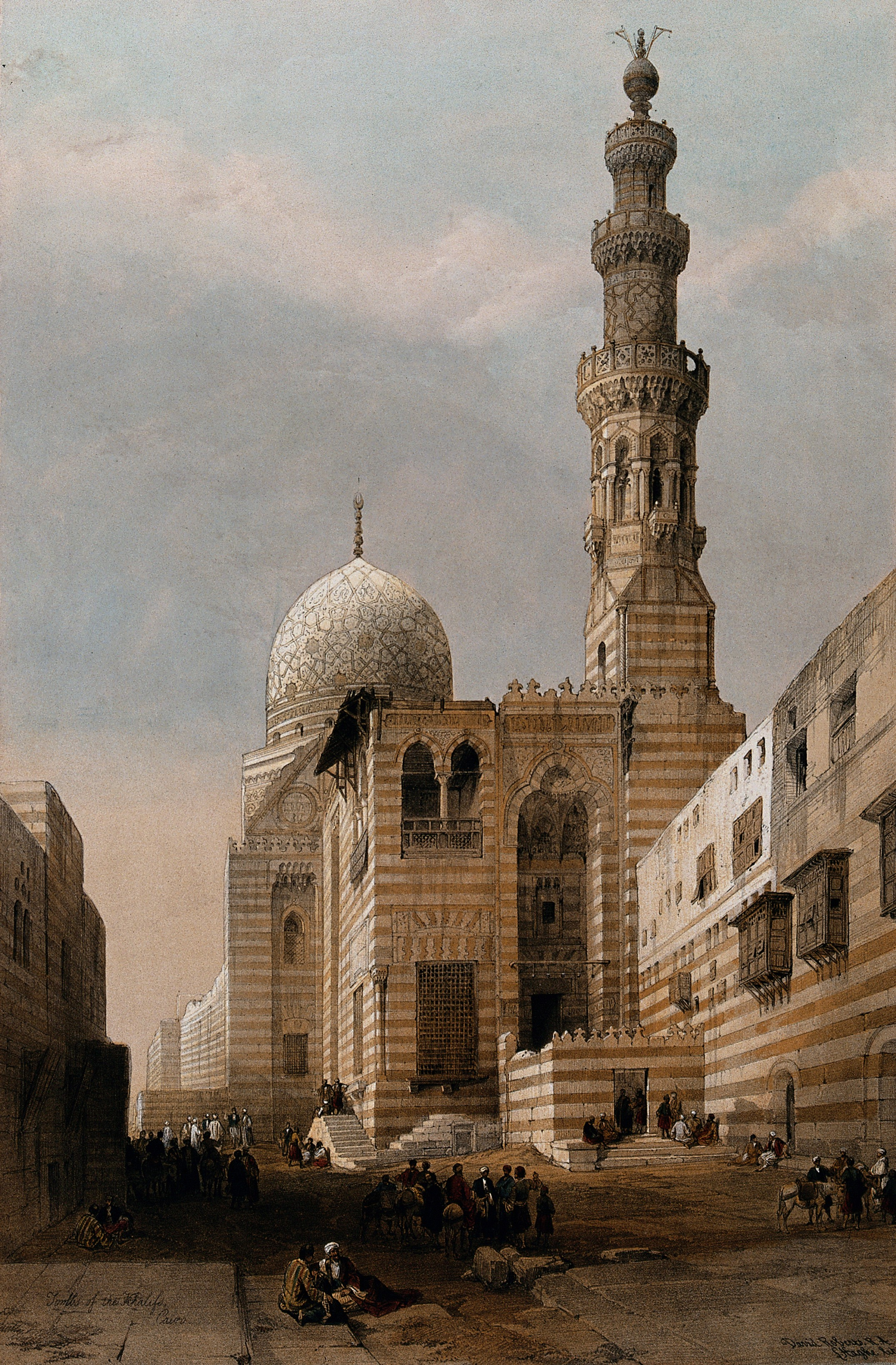
Illustration of the Qaytbay complex by David Roberts (c. 1848)

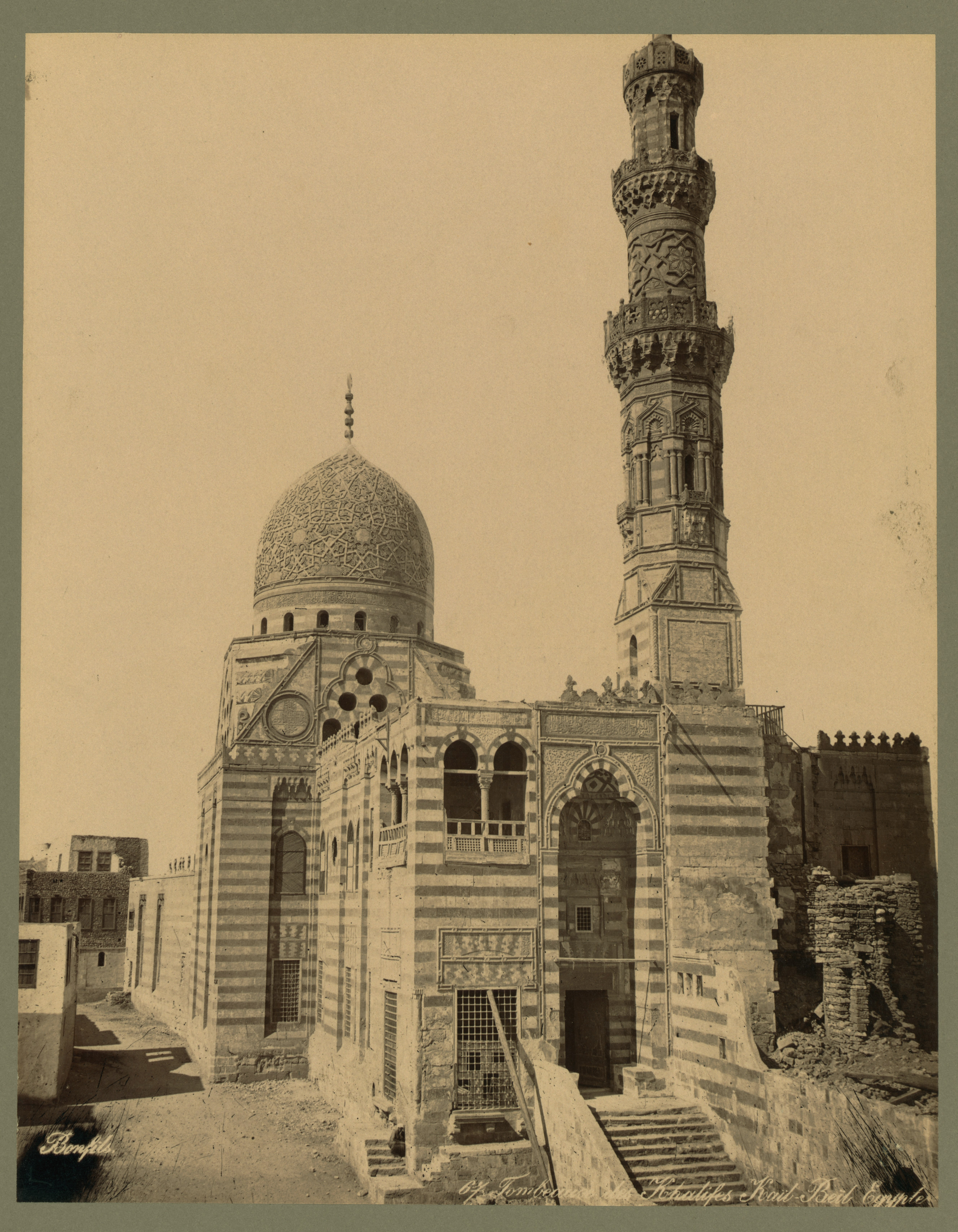
Exterior of the Qaytbay complex (c. 1867)

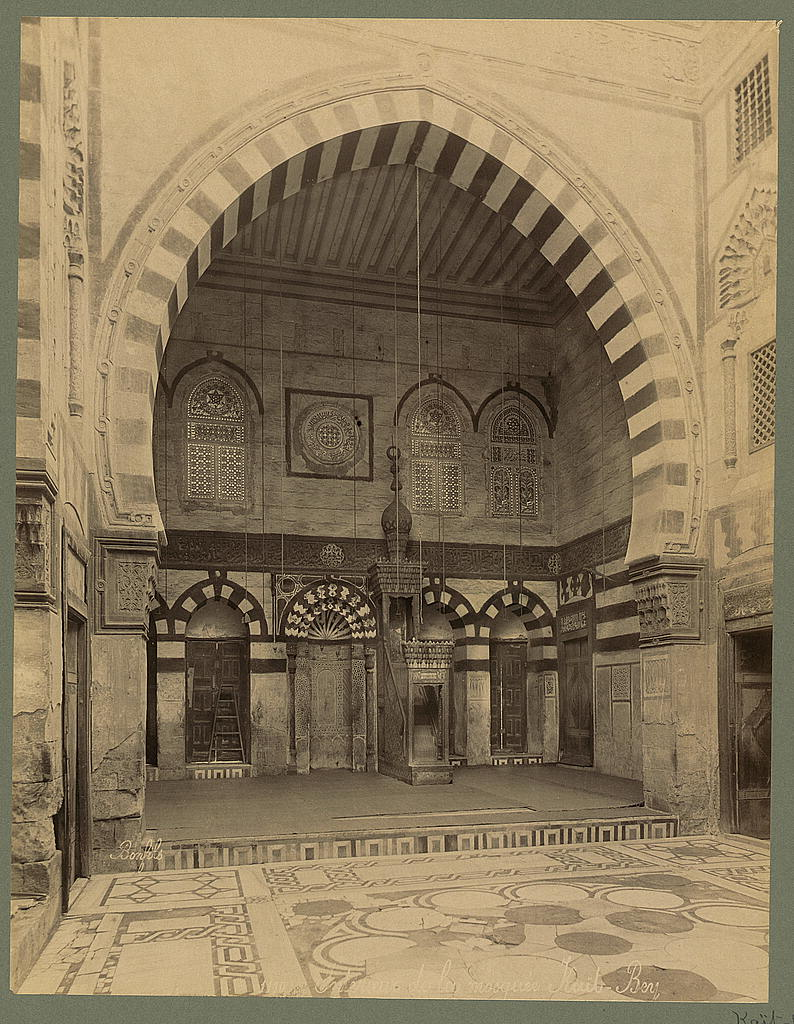
Photo of the mosque's interior (c. 1867)

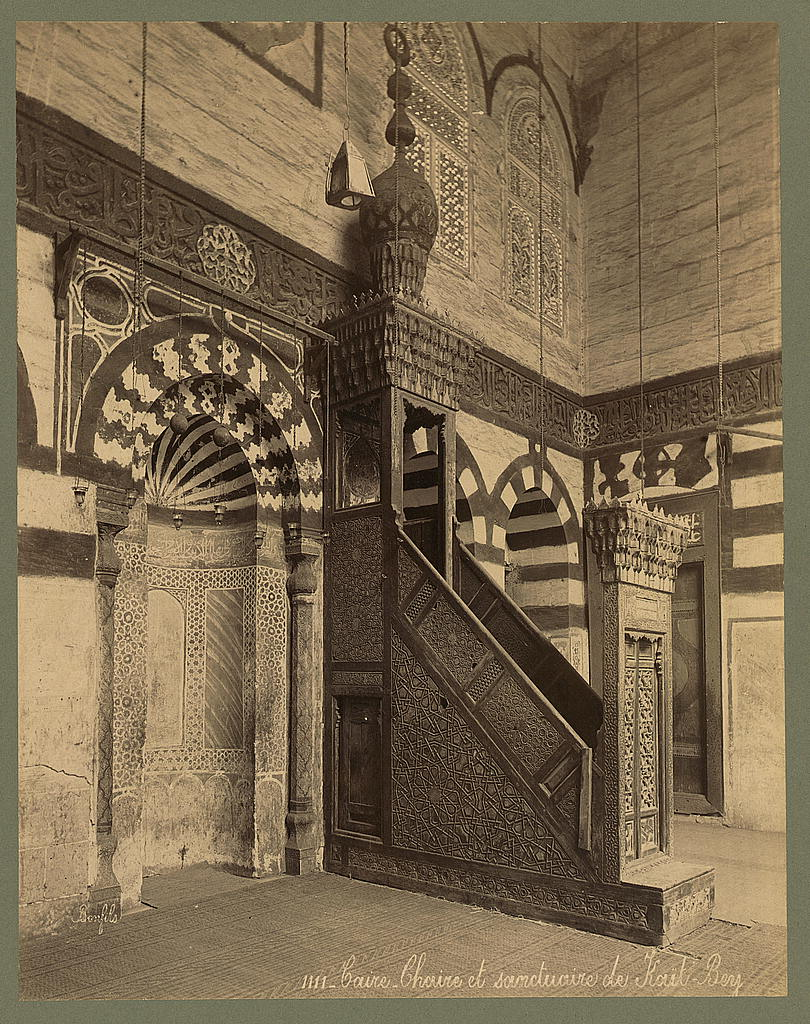
Photo of the mosque's mihrab and minbar (c. 1867)

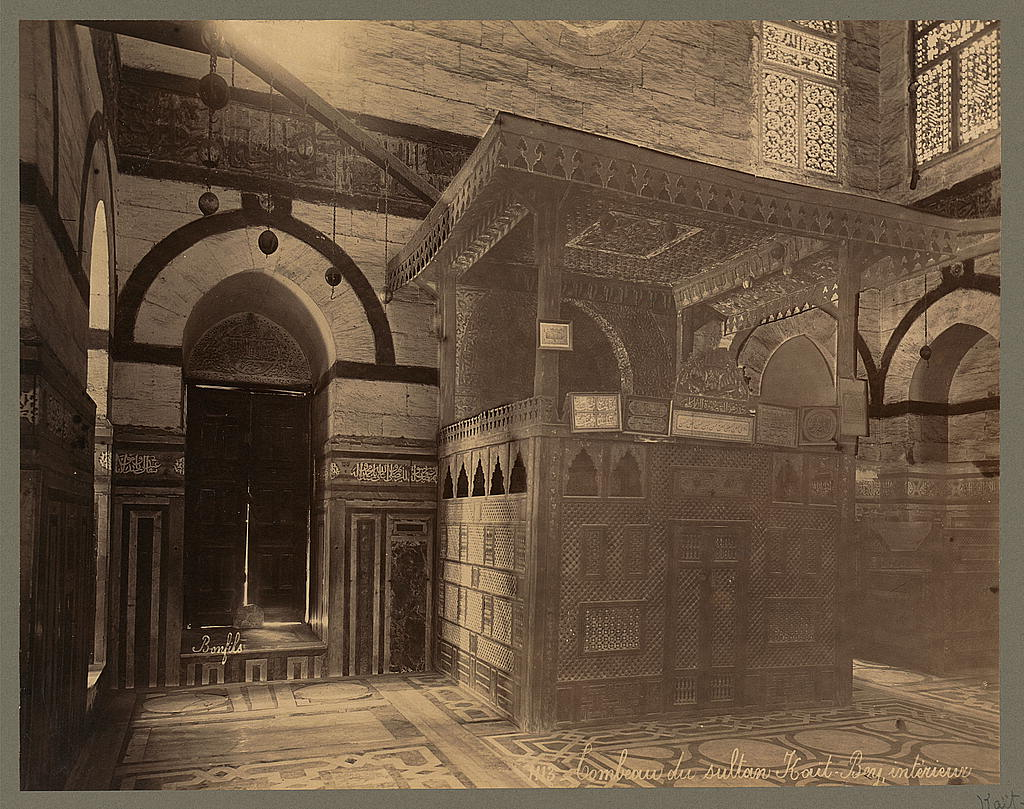
Photo of Qaytbay's tomb chamber (c. 1867)

== Description ==
=== Overview ===
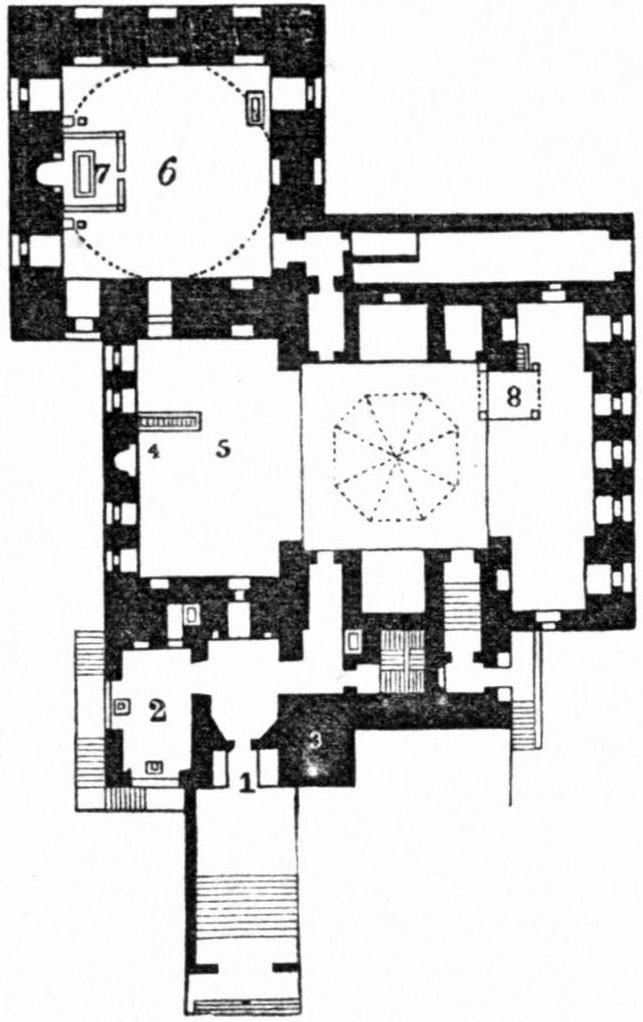
Floor plan of main building: the domed mausoleum is in the top left corner (6); the mosque/madrasa is in the middle (5); and the sabil is the bottom left corner (2).

Qaytbay's complex contained numerous buildings over a relatively vast area, enclosed by the same wall, of which one gate, Bab al-Gindi, still remains to the south of the mausoleum. Many of the original structures which once faced each other on both sides of the existing street have vanished. What remains today is the mosque, which is attached to the mausoleum of Qaytbay himself, as well as a maq'ad (loggia), a smaller mosque and mausoleum for Qaytbay's sons, a hod (drinking trough for animals), and a rab (an apartment complex where tenants paid rent). At one point it was also described to have had large gardens.

=== Mosque/madrasa ===
The mosque (originally a madrasa), along with the mausoleum of the sultan, forms the main building of the complex and is considered exceptional for its refined proportions and the subdued yet exquisite decorations. The mosque's entrance faces north and diverts the main road slightly eastwards around the walls of the mausoleum, possibly to enhance its visual effect. The façade features ablaq stonework (alternating dark and light stone) and the entrance portal is enhanced by a high elaborate groin-vaulted recess with muqarnas squinches. The minaret stands above the entrance on the western side and is exquisitely carved in stone, divided into three stories with elaborately carved balconies. The eastern corner of the façade is occupied by a sabil (from which water could be dispensed to passers-by) on the ground floor and by a kuttab (school) on the top floor. The former is marked by large windows with iron grilles, while the latter is marked by a loggia with open arches on two sides.

Inside, the vestibule features another ornate groin-vault ceiling and leads to the main sanctuary hall which follows a modified layout of the classic madrasa: a central court surrounded by two large iwans on the qibla axis and two shallow or reduced iwans to the sides. The hall is richly decorated in stone-carving, painted wooden ceilings and coloured windows, although the decoration of the mihrab is relatively modest. The wooden lantern ceiling above the central space is notable for its carving and painted pattern but is a restoration work by the "Comité" and not the original. The central floor also features elaborate polychrome patterned marble but is usually covered by carpets.

The wooden minbar, which stands next to the mihrab, is richly carved with geometric patterns and was inlaid with ivory and mother-of-pearl. However, much of this decoration was stripped and stolen when the minbar was looted in 2013.

The mosque/madrasa

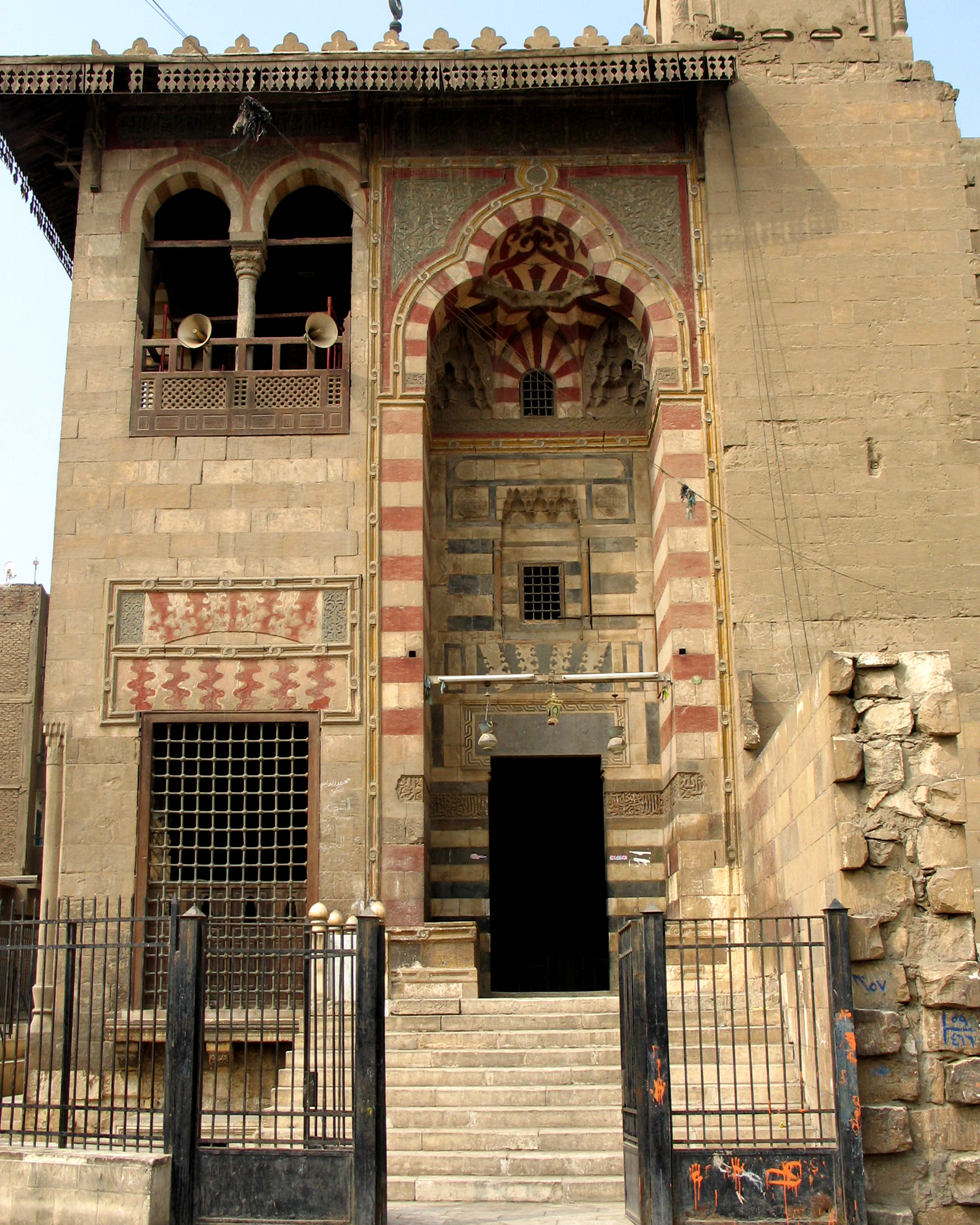
Entrance façade of the mosque/madrasa, with the sabil on the lower left and the kuttab above it

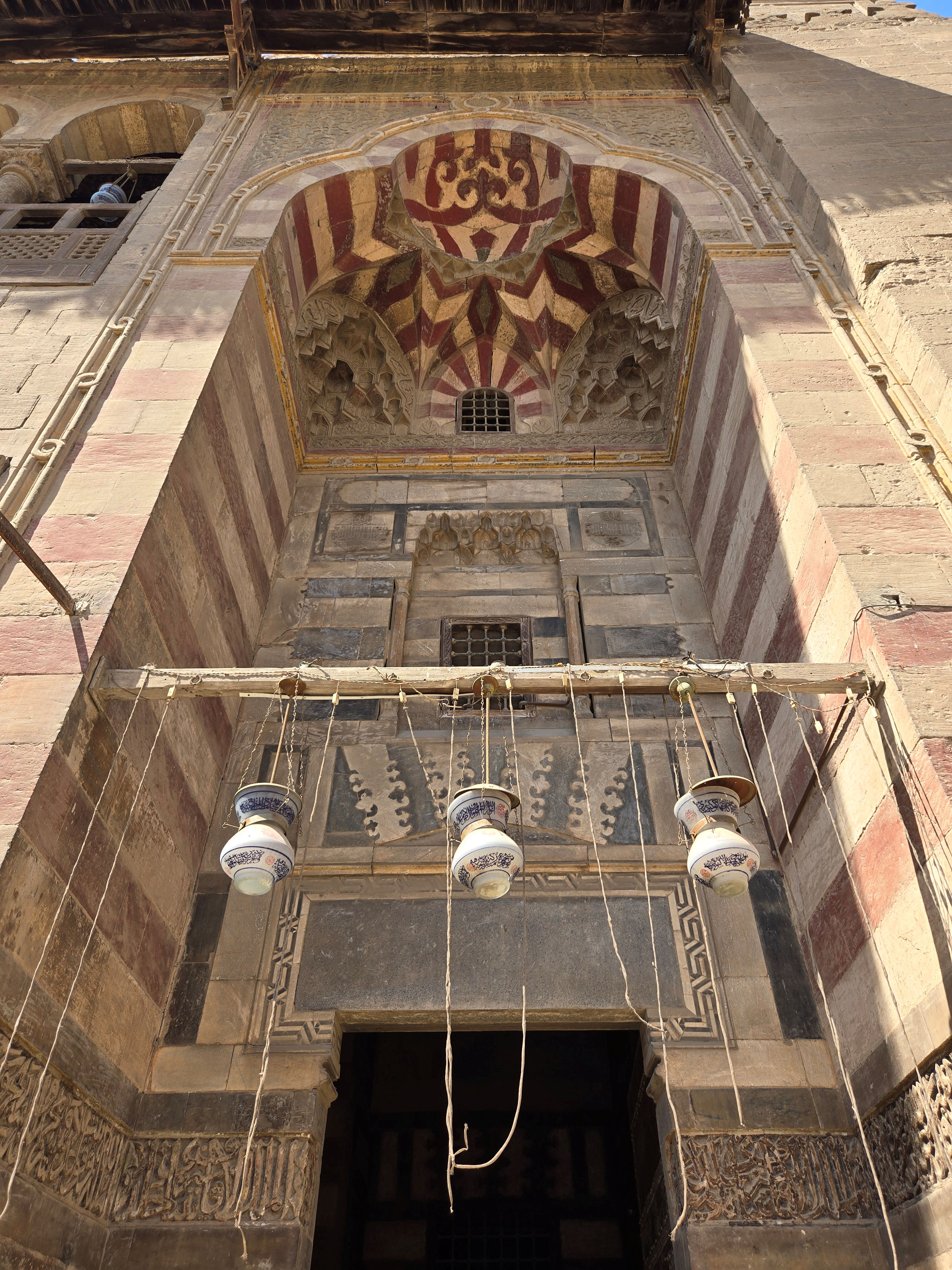
The entrance portal, featuring ablaq masonry and a stone canopy consisting of groin vaults and muqarnas

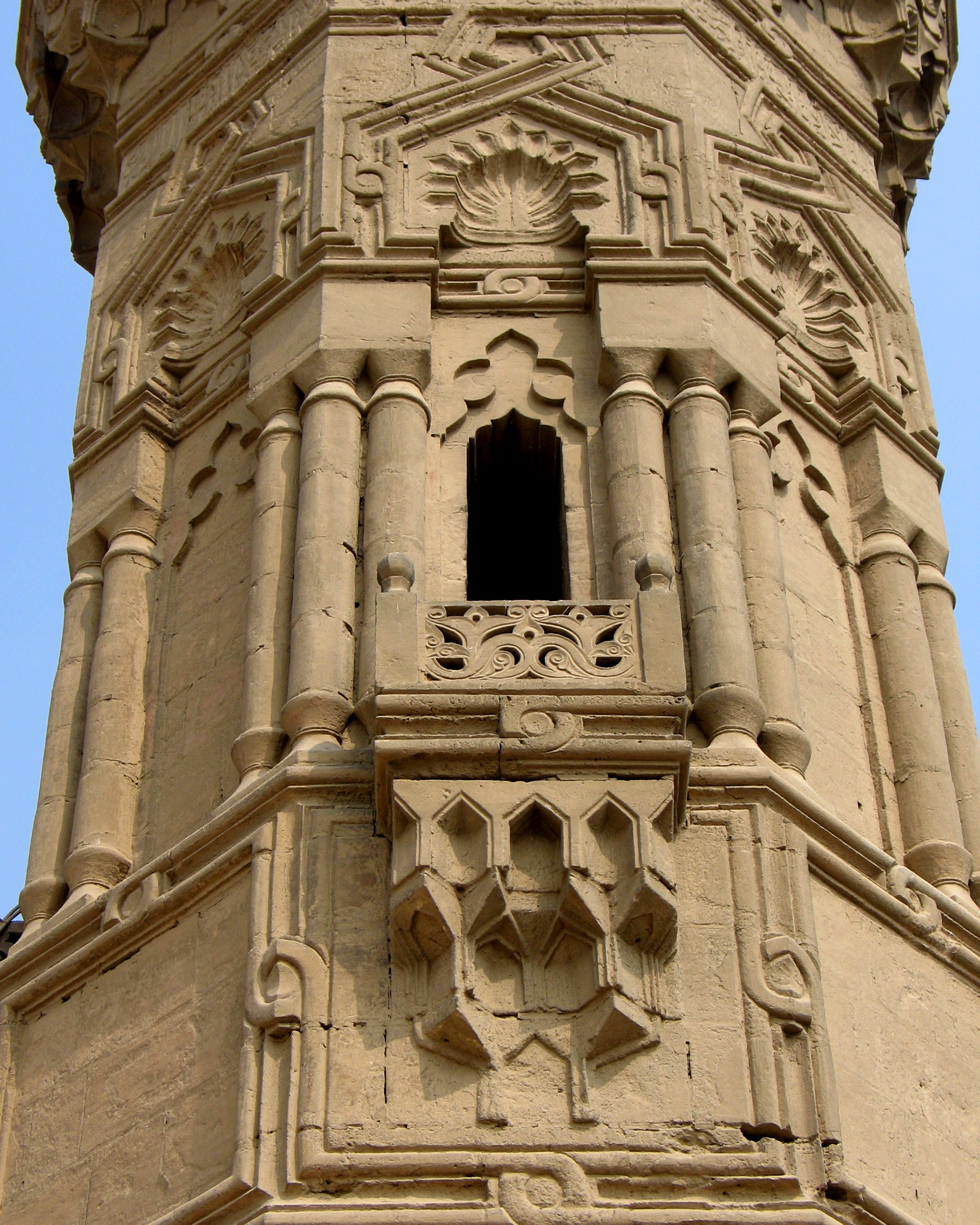
Details of the minaret

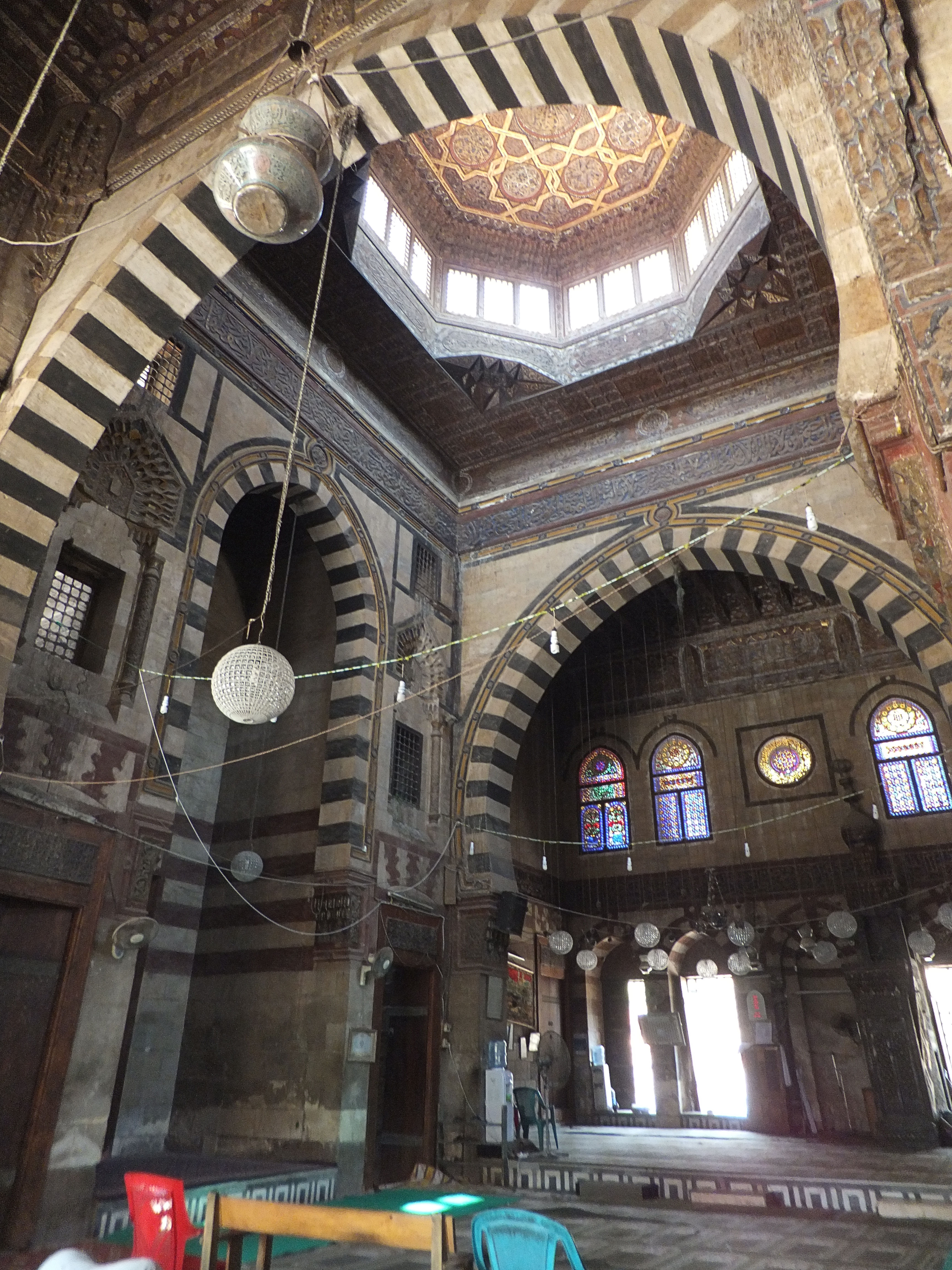
Interior of the mosque/madrasa, with the mihrab on the right

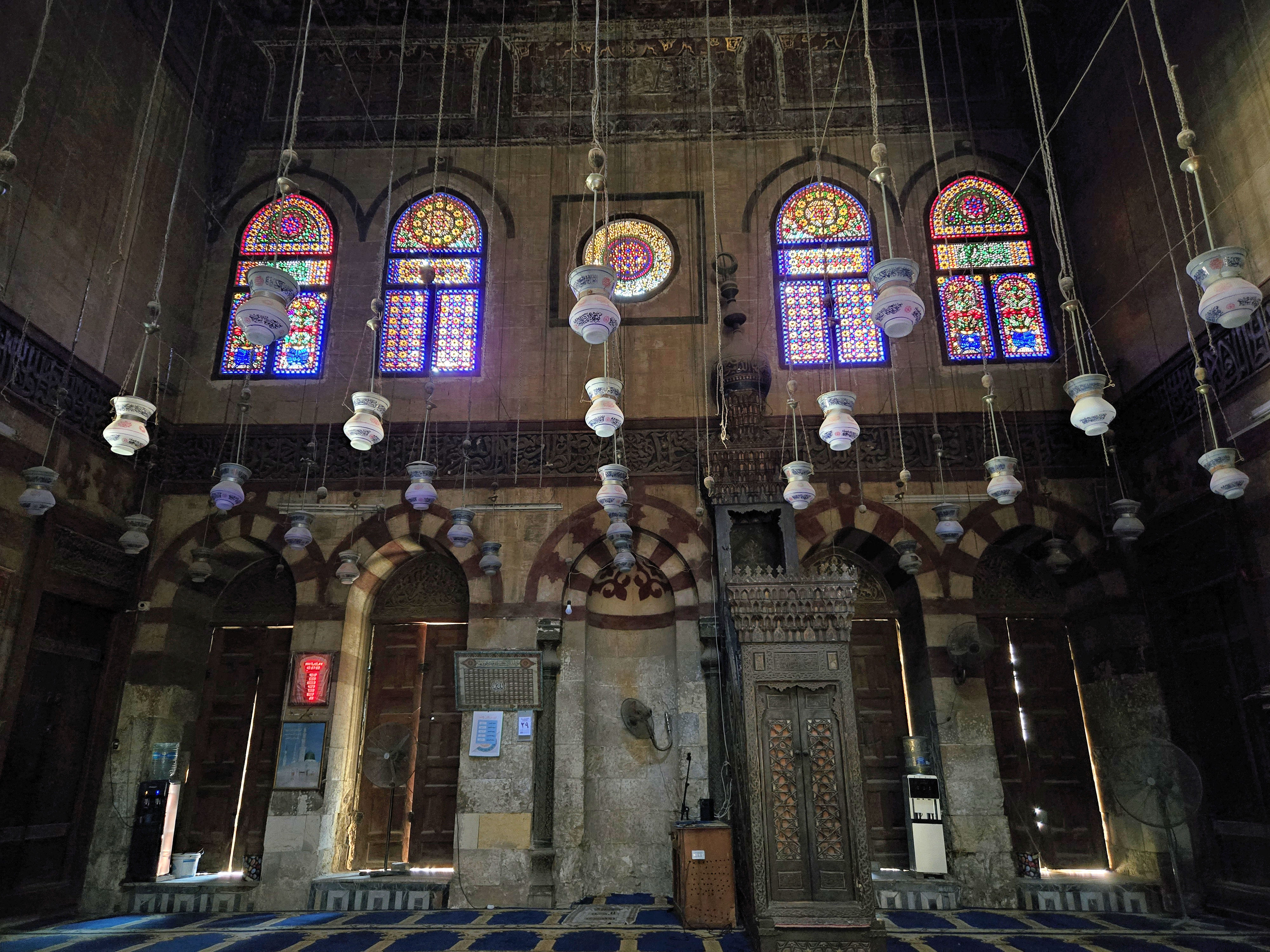
The eastern or qibla iwan of the mosque/madrasa, with the mihrab and minbar in the middle

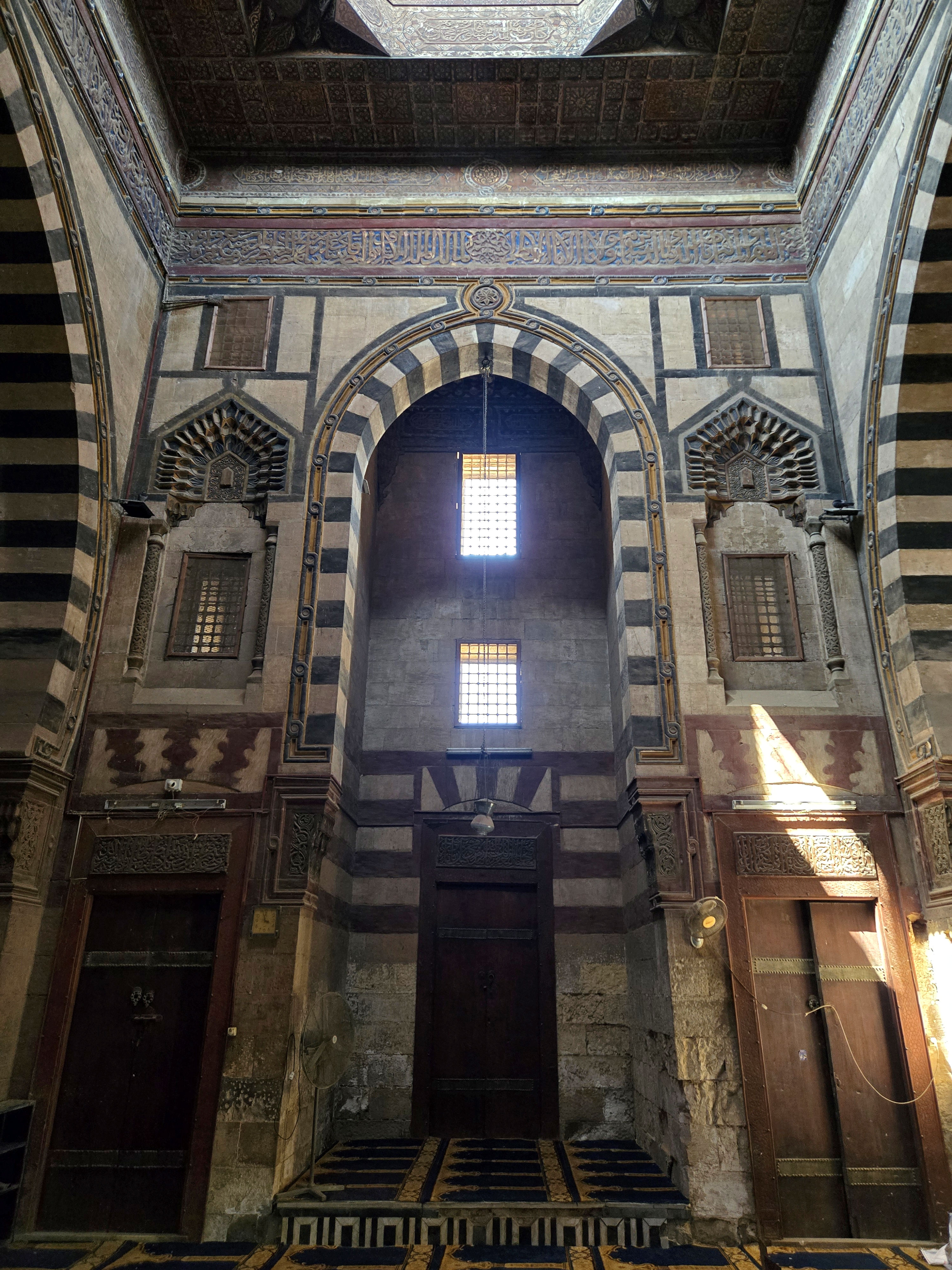
One of the two lateral iwans

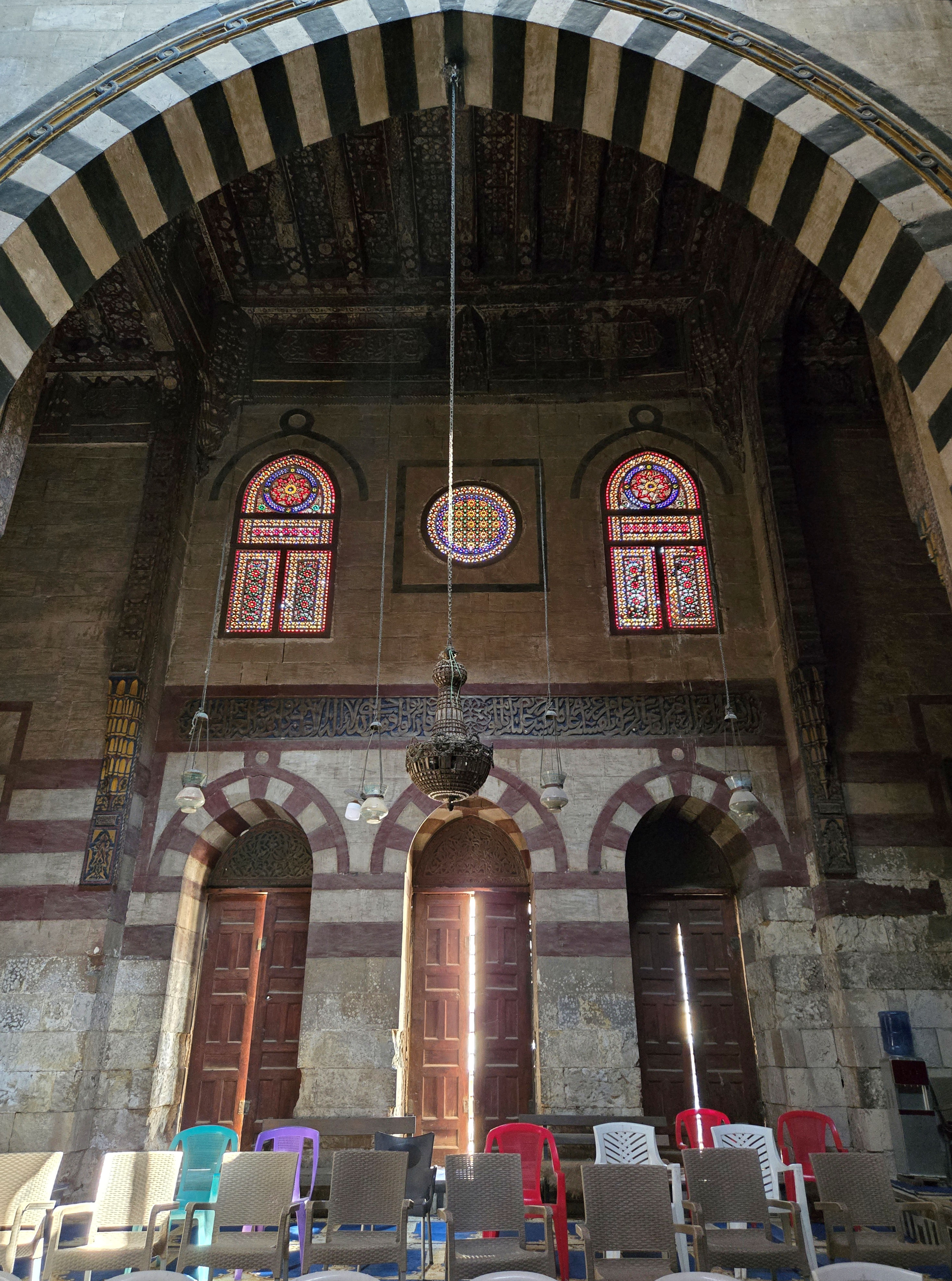
The western iwan (opposite the qibla)

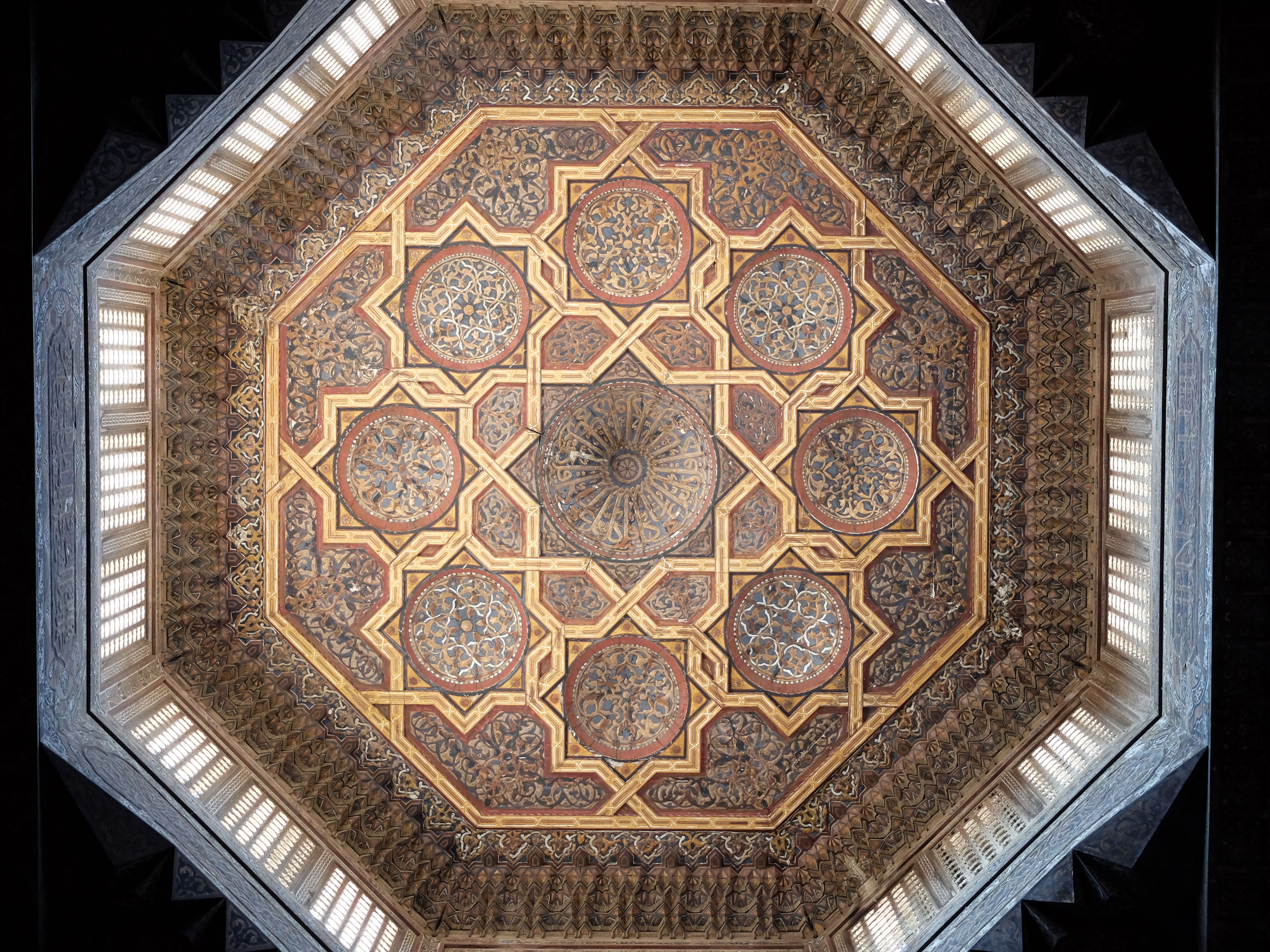
The central lantern ceiling, made of painted wood

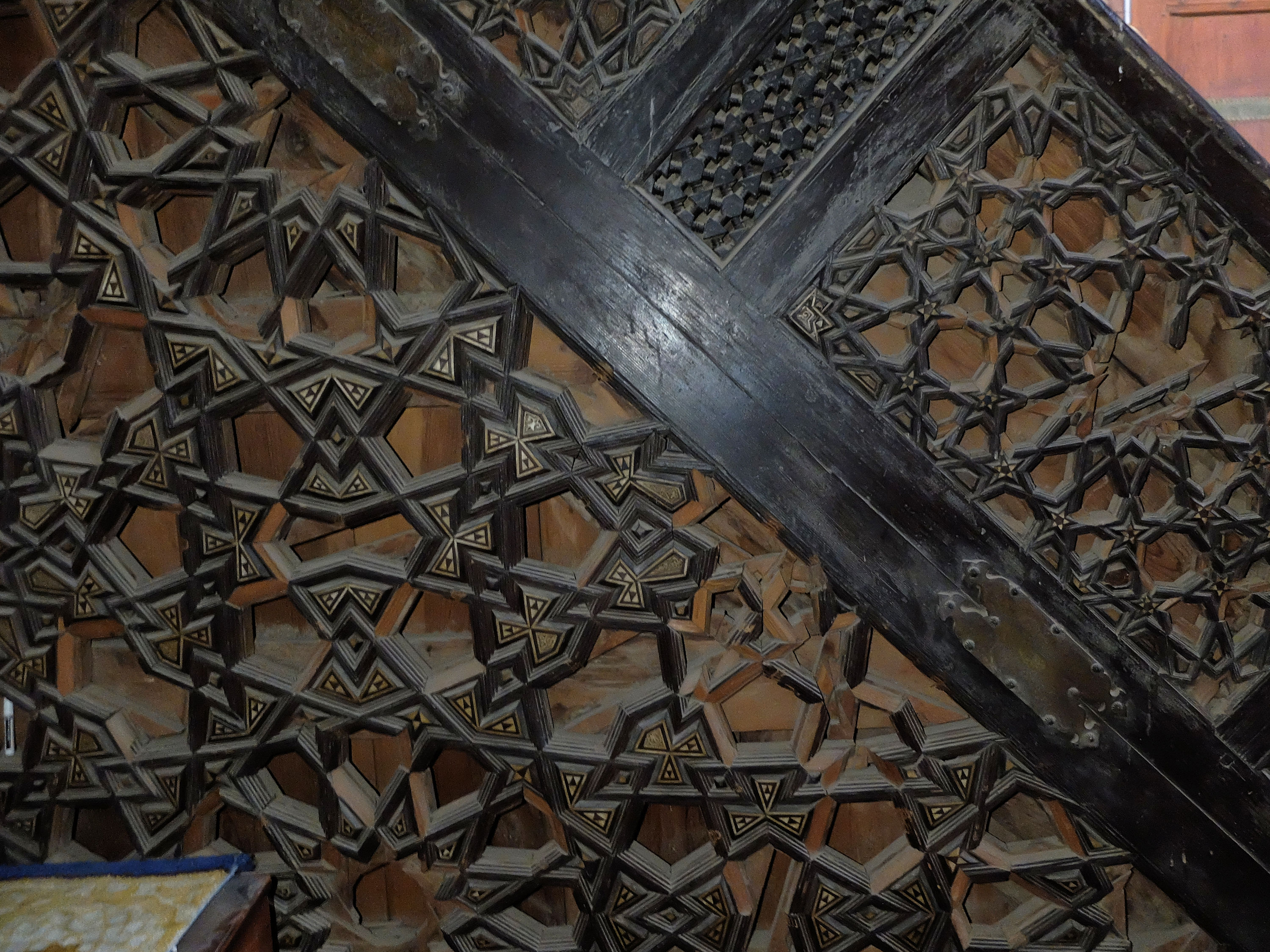
View of one of the minbar's decorated flanks; the broader geometric motif is visible but much of the detailed carving and inlay decoration was looted in 2013.

=== Mausoleum and dome ===
Qaytbay's mausoleum projects from the eastern side of the building, which makes the dome more visible from the street and allows for more light to reach the interior through the northern-facing windows. The outer dome of the mausoleum demonstrates an evolution from the stone domes built earlier and nearby by Sultan Barsbay and others: it is often cited as the apogee of Mamluk dome design in Cairo due to its complex stone-carved decorative pattern. This pattern features a central geometric star radiating from the apex of the dome and an arabesque floral design which are superimposed and enhanced by natural shadows.

On the inside, the mausoleum chamber is reached from a door next to the qibla wall. It is decorated with a carved and ablaq mihrab, polychrome marble paneling, and a high dome with muqarnas pendentives. It contains the sultan's tomb as well as an alleged footprint of Muhammad brought from Mecca.

The mausoleum

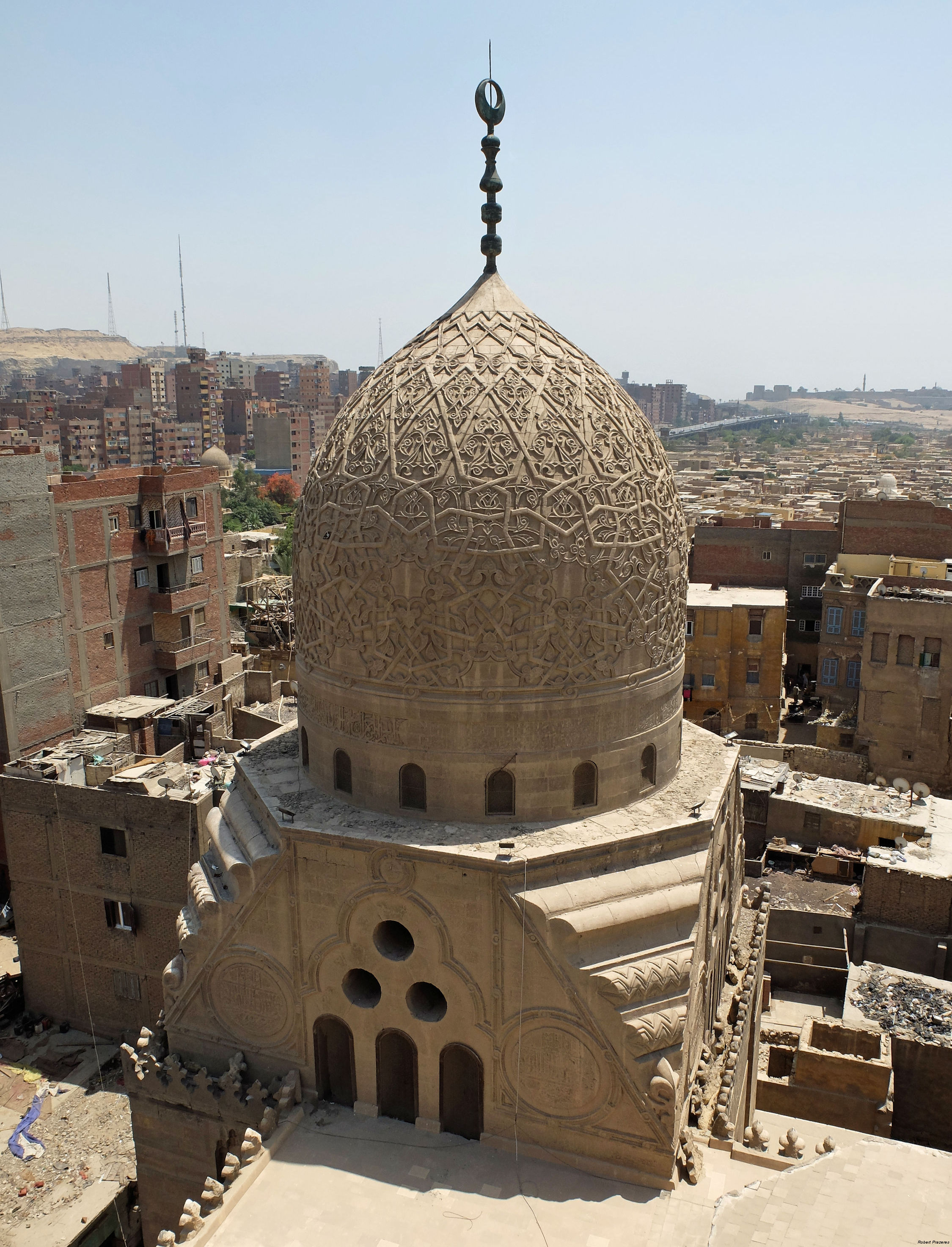
The mausoleum dome

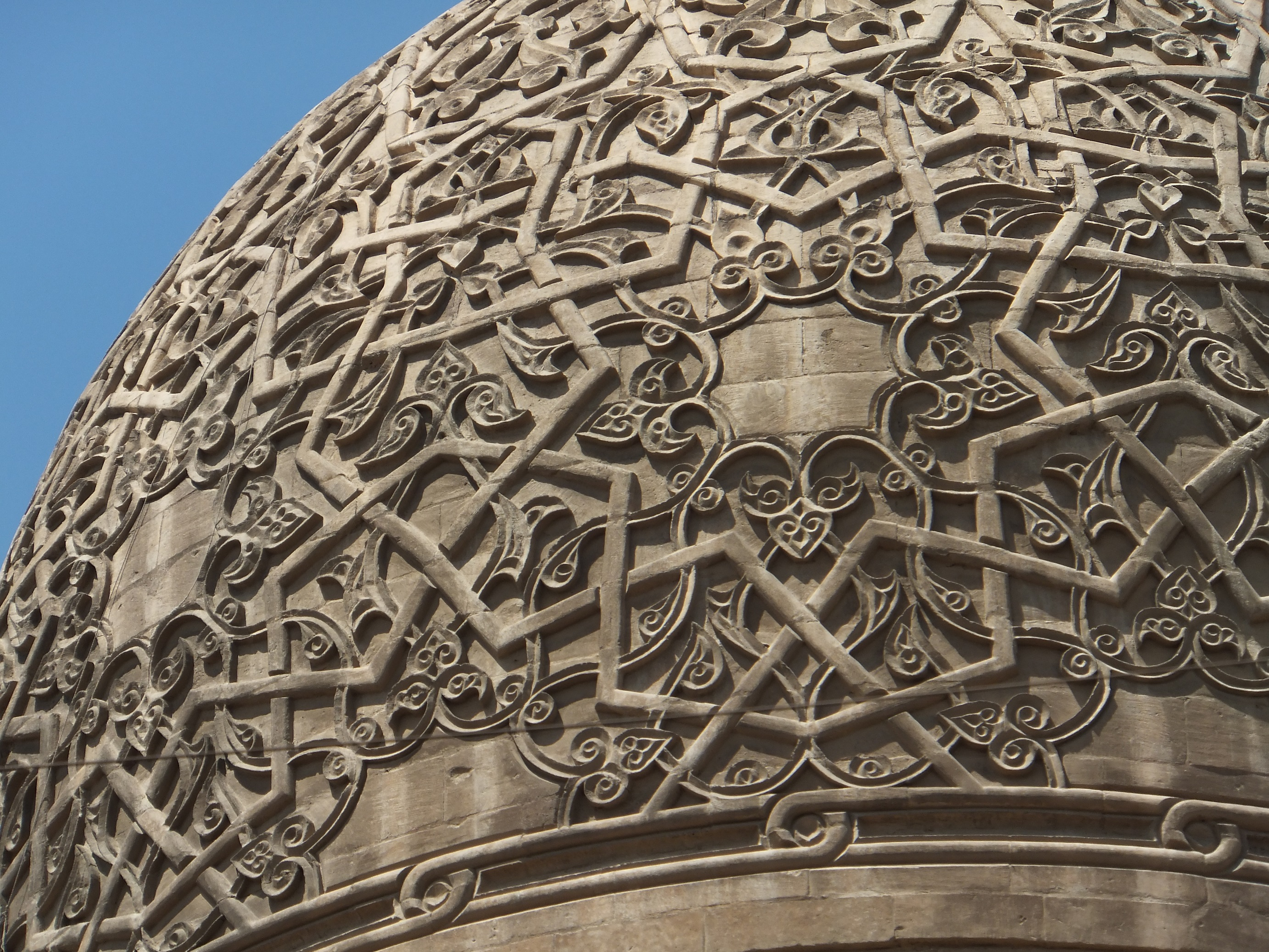
Closeup of the dome's stone-carved relief patterns

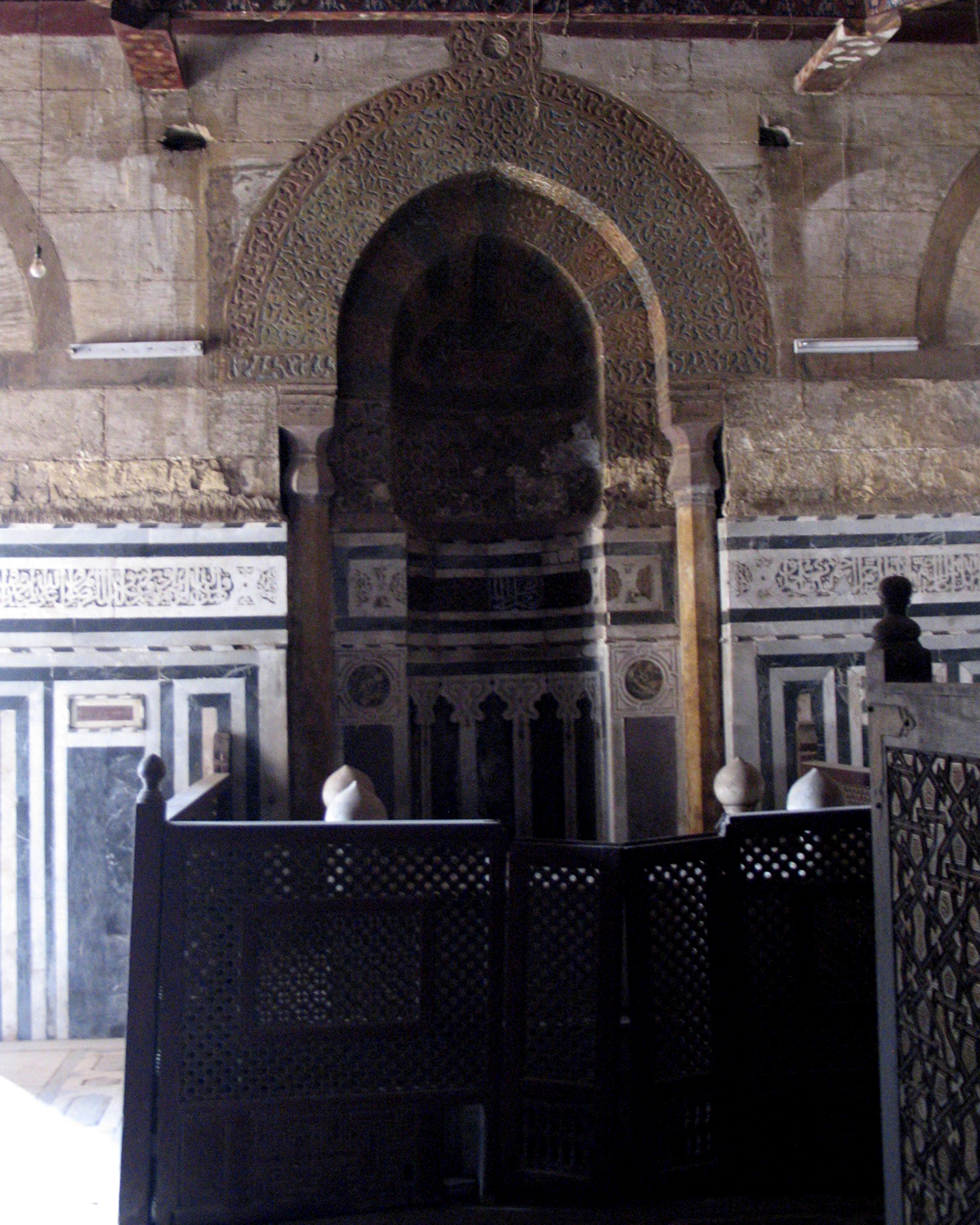
The mausoleum chamber of Sultan Qaytbay, with mihrab visible, 2006

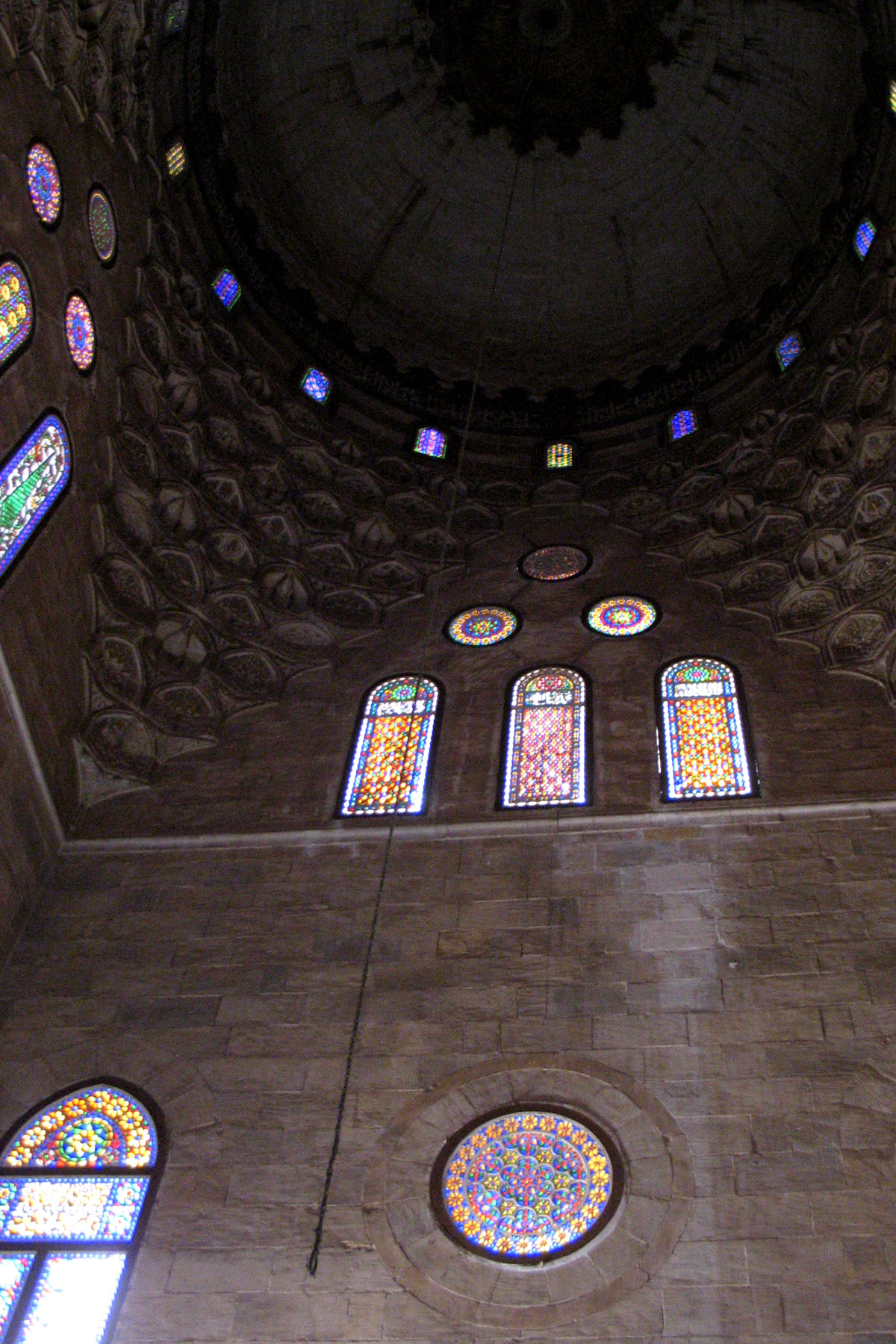
Interior of the mausoleum dome

=== Other structures ===
To the west of Qaytbay's main mosque is a smaller domed tomb which may have been built earlier when Qaytbay was only an amir, but was later dedicated to his sons. It was later used by a Turkish Sufi named Gulshani during the Ottoman period. The small dome is decorated on the outside in a stone-carved pattern similar to that of the sultan's mausoleum but slightly simpler. The tomb is attached to a building which seems to have been part of the royal residential complex which Qaytbay built. Just west of this is a maq'ad, which usually denotes a loggia overlooking a courtyard but in this case is an enclosed hall with many windows, located over storage rooms.

Just to the north of the mosque, on the main street, is a hod or drinking trough for animals, with shallow decorative niches along its wall. Further north are the semi-ruined remains of a rab or apartment complex on the west side of the main street. It is partially buried below street level but its high vaulted entrance portal is still visible.

Other structures

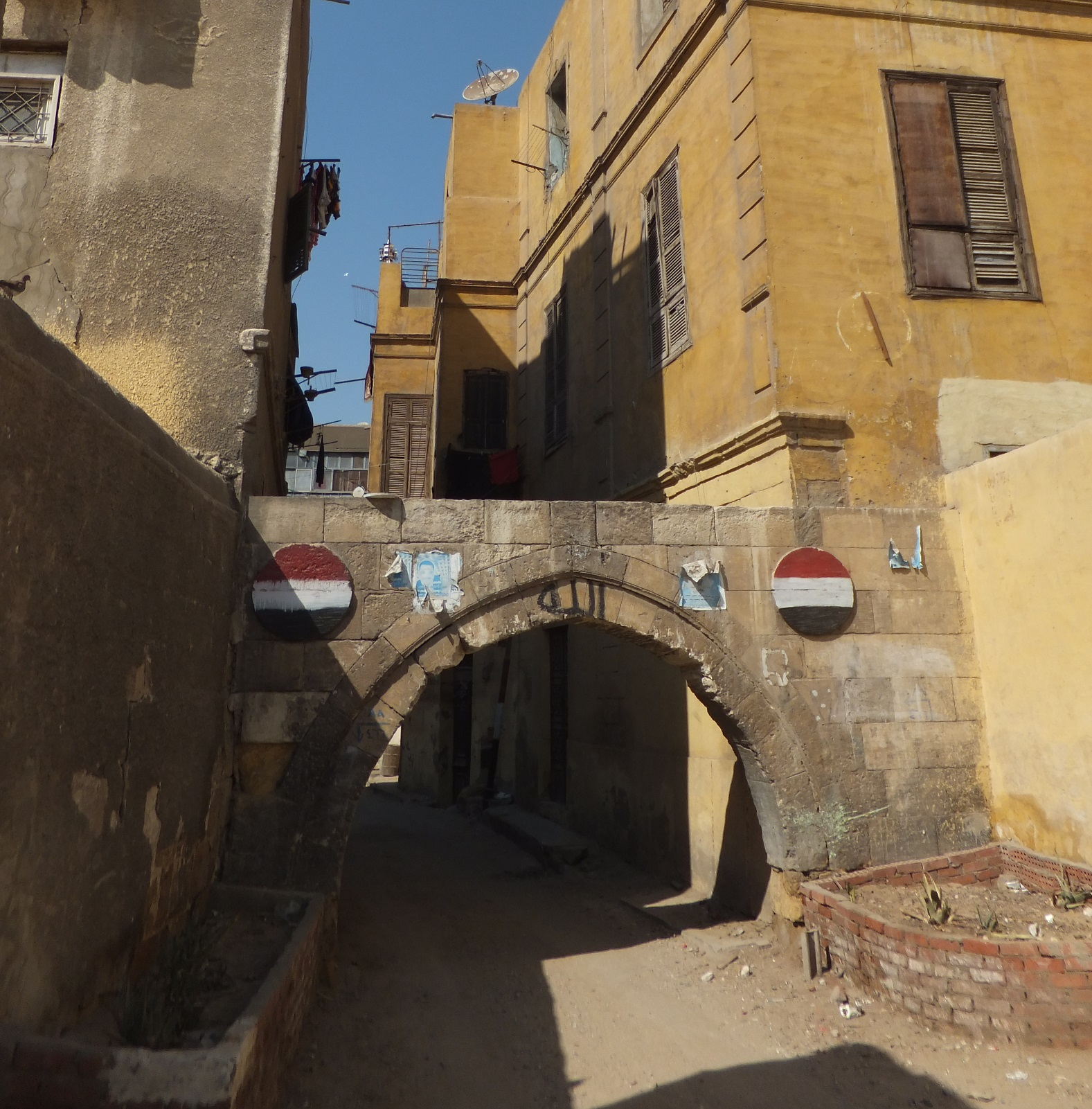
The remains of the old gate of Qaytbay's complex, Bab al-Gindi

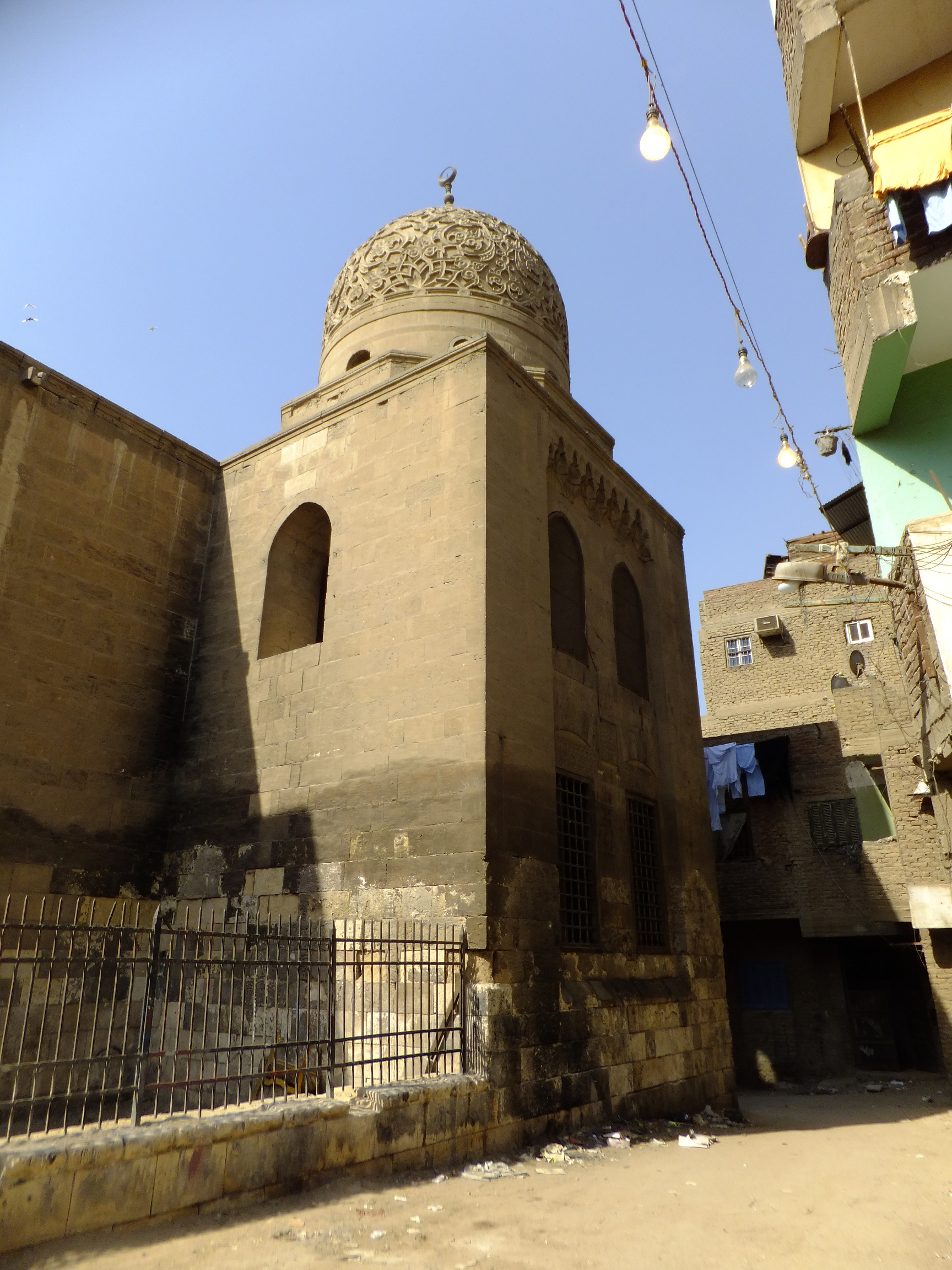
The smaller attached mausoleum, dedicated to Qaytbay's son and, later, to Gulshani

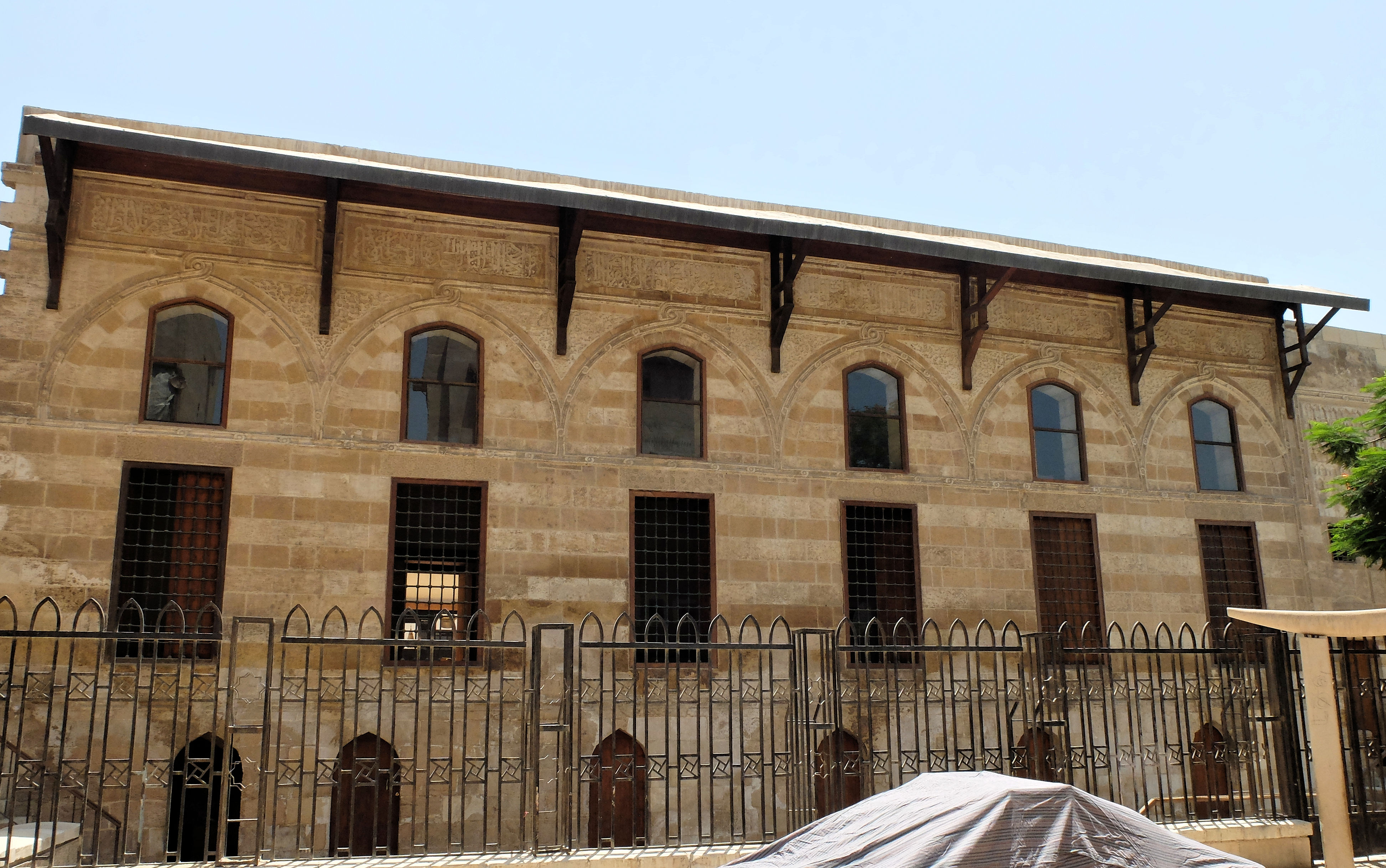
The (recently restored) maq'ad of Qaytbay's complex, a part of the residential compound he built

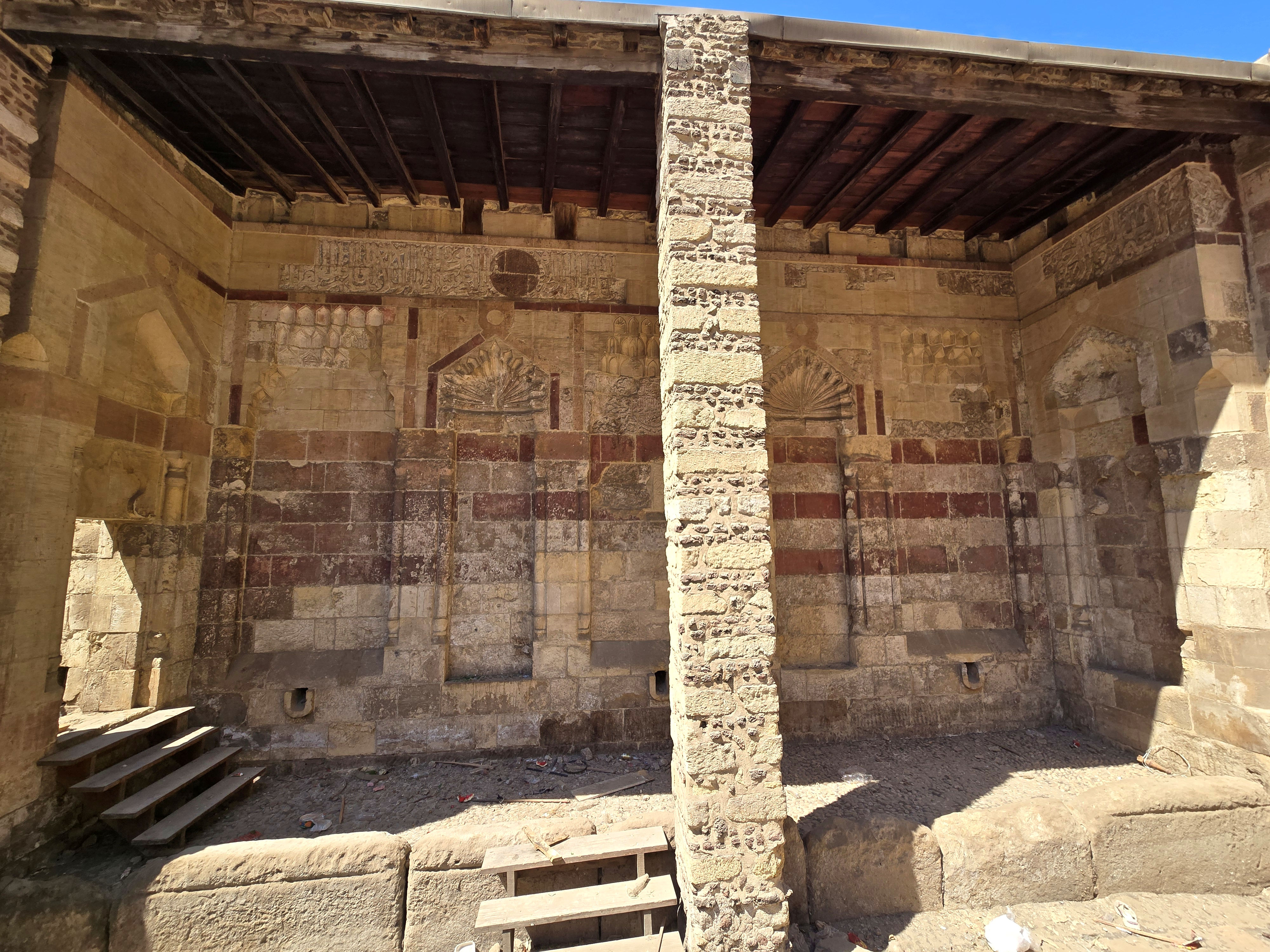
The hod of Qaytbay complex, a drinking trough for animals

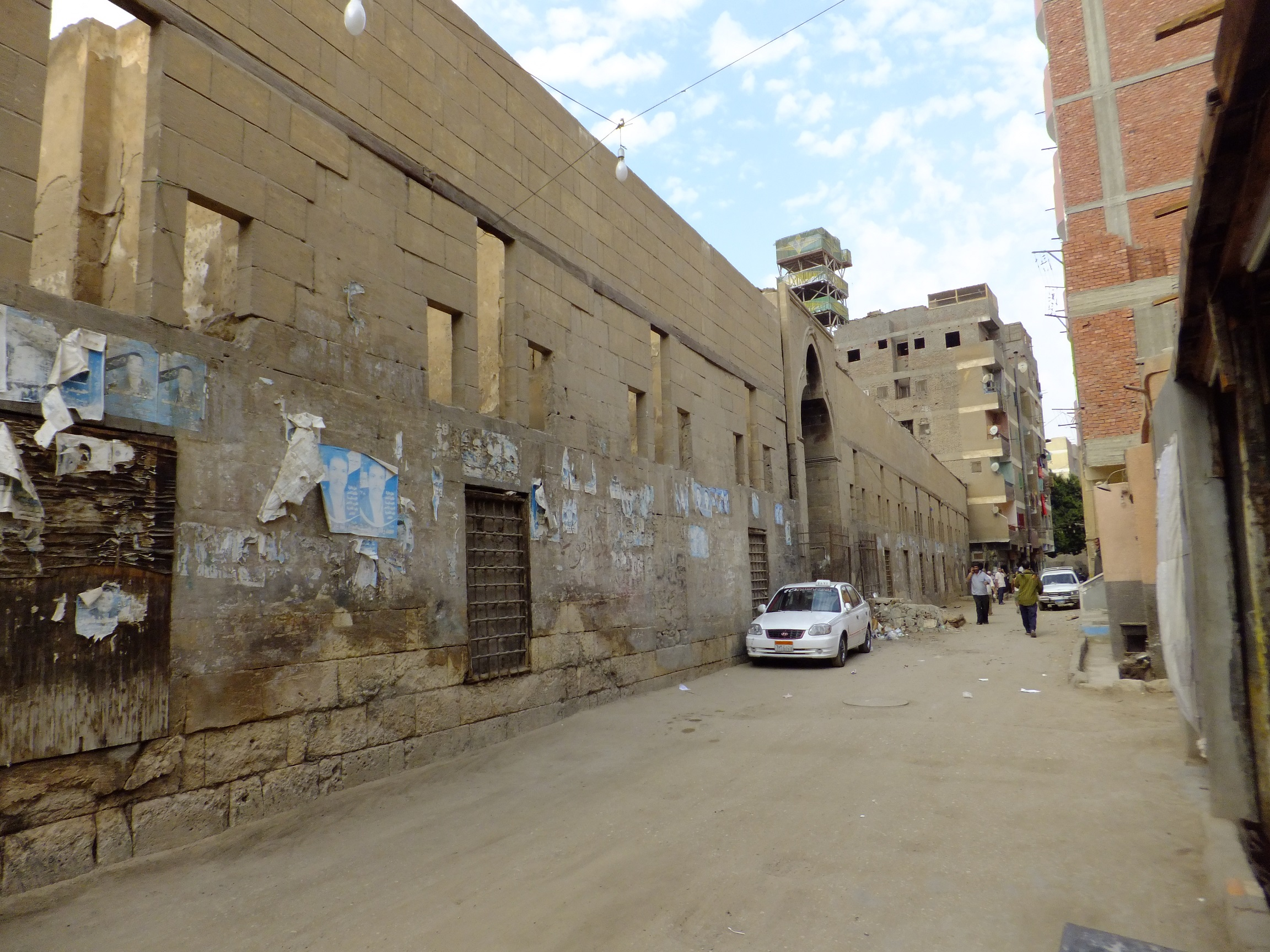
The remains of the rab or apartment bloc of Qaytbay's complex, north of the mosque

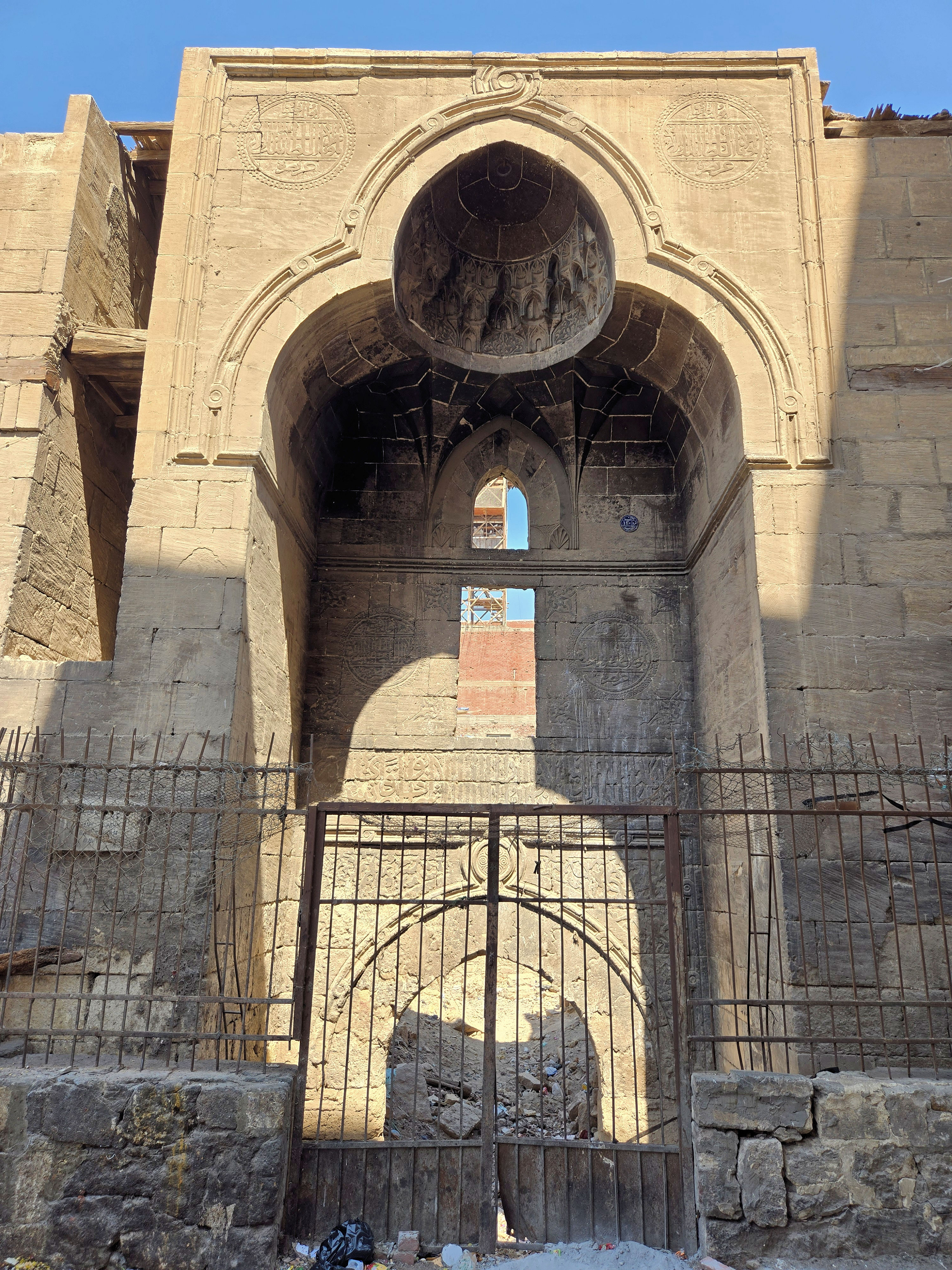
Portal of the rab of Qaytbay's complex

== Modern-day use and restoration ==
For the past few years, the Cairo-based ARCHiNOS Architecture has been conserving monuments within the funerary complex of Sultan al-Ashraf Qaitbey. The work is primarily financed by the European Union and done under the auspices of the Historic Cairo Project within the Egyptian Ministry of Antiquities. ARCHiNOS has increasingly included social development and cultural components in its work, and has adapted the reception hall in the Sultan's onetime residence (maq‘ad) for a hub of art and culture in the neighbourhood. ARCHiNOS also upgraded the small urban square in front of the building to make it a fitting setting for various cultural events organised in and around the maq‘ad of Sultan Qaitbey. In 2016, the not-for-profit Sultan Foundation has been established to provide access to culture in the underprivileged neighbourhood and to promote links between preservation of cultural heritage and social and economic development.

== See also ==
- Islam in Egypt
- List of mausoleums in Egypt
- List of mosques in Cairo
- Mosque of Qaytbay (Qal'at al-Kabsh)
