= Al-Mu'ayyad Shihab al-Din Ahmad =

Sultan of Egypt and Syria (r. 26 Feb 1461–28 June 1461)

Sultan of Egypt and Syria
- Reign: 26 February 1461 – 28 June 1461
- Predecessor: Sayf ad-Din Inal
- Successor: Sayf ad-Din Khushqadam
- Born: 1430; Cairo
- Died: 28 January 1488 (aged 57–58); Alexandria
Names
- Al-Mu'ayyad Shihab al-Din Ahmad bin Sayf ad-Din Inal
- Father: Sayf ad-Din Inal
- Mother: Khawand Zaynab

Al-Mu'ayyad Shihab al-Din Ahmad (Arabic: المؤيد شهاب الدين أحمد بن اينال; 1430 – 28 January 1488) was the son of Sayf ad-Din Inal, and a Mamluk sultan of Egypt from 26 February to 28 June 1461.

== Biography ==
Shihab al-Din Ahmad was born in Cairo to Sayf ad-Din Inal and Khawand Zaynab bint Khasbek. He was emir al-hajj ("commander of the pilgrimage [to Mecca]"), before he was proclaimed sultan on 26 February 1461, after his father became ill.

However, Ahmad ruled for four months before peacefully abdicating on 28 June as a result of pressure from an alliance of powerful mamluk factions opposed to his leadership, including the Zahiris, Ashrafis, Nasiris and his own Mu'ayyadis. They were led by Sayf ad-Din Khushqadam who became sultan in Ahmad's stead. Ahmad was imprisoned along with his brother Al-Nasri Mohammed in Alexandria, until he was released during the reign of Timurbugha in 1467.

He was allowed to return to Cairo with his son Ali by Sultan Qaitbay, when his mother became ill in 1479. He later returned to Alexandria and lived there until his death on 28 January 1488.

His only known wife was the daughter of Süleyman Bey, ruler of the Dulkadirid. She had been previously married to Sultan Sayf ad-Din Jaqmaq. She died on 27 April 1460.

== Sources ==
- Natho, Kadir I. (2010). Circassian History. Xlibris Corporation. ISBN 978-1441523884.
- Raymond, A. (2000). Cairo. Harvard University Press. ISBN 0674003160. "Uthman Inal Sultan."

Regnal titles
Preceded by Sayf ad-Din Inal	Mamluk Sultan of Egypt; 26 February 1461–28 June 1461	Succeeded by Sayf ad-Din Khushqadam
