= Sayf al-Din Bilbay =

Sultan of Egypt and Syria
- Reign: 9 October 1467 – 5 December 1467
- Predecessor: Sayf al-Din Khushqadam
- Successor: Timurbugha
- Born: Unknown
- Died: 19 September 1468; Alexandria

Sayf al-Din Bilbay or Yalbay (Arabic: الظاهر سيف الدين بلباي; d. 19 September 1468) was a Mamluk sultan of Egypt from 9 October to 4 December 1467.

== Biography ==
Bilbay was of Circassian descent. He was brought to Egypt during the reign of Al-Mu'ayyad Shaykh. He owned lands and became emir of ten under Barsbay, then emir of drums under Jaqmaq. He was imprisoned by Al-Mansur Fakhr-ad-Din Uthman, then freed by Sayf ad-Din Inal. Later on, he became atabeg in September 1466 under Khushqadam.

He became a sultan in October 1467, following the death of Khushqadam. During his reign, he became reliant on his dwidar kabir (grand executive), Khairbek. However, the Dhahiri Mamluks captured Bilbay and deposed him on 5 December 1467, then Timurbugha was proclaimed sultan.

Bilbay was later imprisoned in Alexandria, where he died from plague on 19 September 1468.

== Sources ==
- Natho, Kadir I. (2010). Circassian History. Xlibris Corporation. ISBN 978-1441523884.

Regnal titles
Preceded by Sayf al-Din Khushqadam	Mamluk Sultan of Egypt; 9 October 1467–4 December 1467	Succeeded by Timurbugha
