= Sayf al-Din Khushqadam =

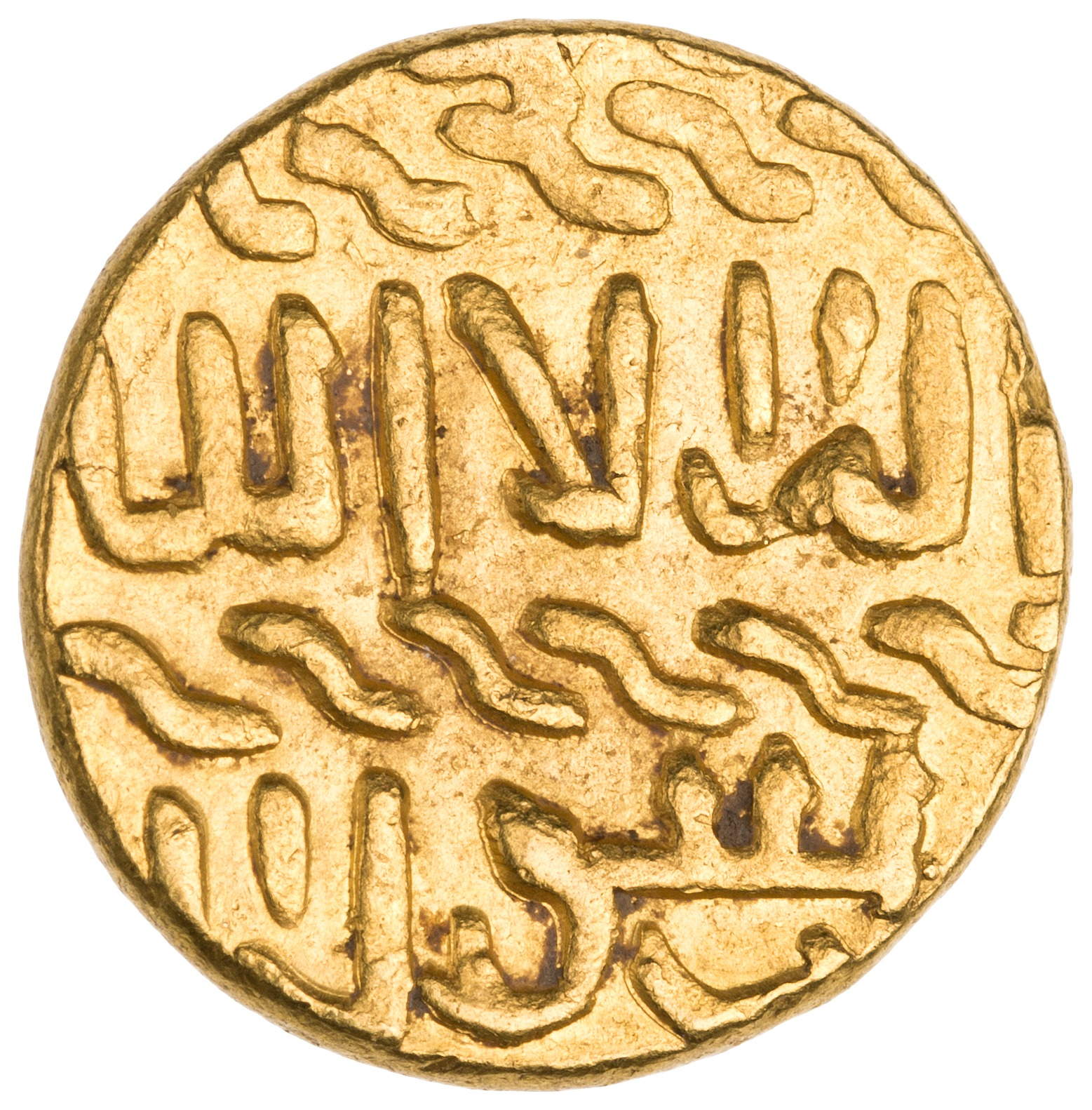
- Gold dinar of Mamluk sultan Khushqadam minted in Cairo in 1462/63

Sultan of Egypt and Syria
- Reign: 28 June 1461 – 9 October 1467
- Predecessor: Shihab al-Din Ahmad
- Successor: Sayf al-Din Bilbay
- Born: c. 1404; Rumelia
- Died: 9 October 1467 (aged 62–63); Cairo
- Spouse: Khawand Shukurbay; Khawand Surbay

Al-Malik al-Ẓāhir Sayf al-Dīn Abū Saʿīd Khushqadam ibn ʿAbdallāh al-Nāṣirī l-Muʾayyadī (Arabic: الظاهر سيف الدين خشقدم; c. 1404 – 9 October 1467) was a Mamluk sultan of Egypt and Syria from 28 June 1461 to 9 October 1467. He was born in Cairo, Egypt.

== Early life and career ==
Originally a Greek or Albanian from Rumelia, Khushqadam was a slave purchased by Al-Mu'ayyad Shaykh, and later served in the jâmdâr corps. (Note: Jâmdâr used to attend to the attire of the sultan.) He eventually became a member of the sultan's guards during the reign of his son, Al-Muzaffar Ahmad. He ascended to the rank of "emir of ten" in Damascus by 1446.

In 1448, Khushqadam was in Kozan, where a mosque was dedicated in his honor. He later became the head of the court military in Cairo in 1450 and served as minister of war during Sayf al-Din Inal's reign in 1456, leading expeditions against the Karamanids.

== Reign ==
Upon Inal's death in February 1461, his son Shihab al-Din Ahmad succeeded him and Khushqadam assumed the role of atabeg. However, the sultan was abducted four months later due to pressure from an alliance of powerful mamluk factions. The mamluks of Inal offered the throne to Jânim, governor of Damascus; meanwhile, the mamluks of Jaqmaq preferred Khushqadam and hurried to elect him before the arrival of Jânim. Amidst political turmoil, Khushqadam seized power and became a sultan.

However, his reign was marked by anarchy and extortion, allowing Egypt to weaken while the Ottoman Empire strengthened. The rivalry between the Ottomans and the Mamluks intensified over the succession of vassal principalities, particularly the Karamanids and the Dulkadirids. Disputes over succession led to conflicts, with the Ottomans ultimately aiming to end the autonomy of these territories.

On 9 October 1467, Khushqadam succumbed to dysentery without naming a successor, leading to a power struggle between rival factions, notably emirs Bilbay and Timurbugha.

== Family ==
One of Khushqadam's wives was Khawand Shukurbay. She was a Circassian, and had been a manumitted slave of Sultan An-Nasir Faraj. She had been married to Amir Abruk al-Jakami, with whom she had a daughter, Baykhun (died 31 July 1462). After Arbuk's death, she married Khushqadam. Her daughter became known as the Sultan's step-daughter. She was buried in Khushqadam's tomb, and her son Shihab al-Din Ahmad al-Ayni (died 1503) was raised by Khushqadam after his father's death. Shukurbay was said to have been exceptionally strong willed. After her death in 1466, Khushqadam married Khawand Surbay, one of several concubines acquired by him, and with whom he had a daughter.

== Sources ==
- D'hulster, Kristof (2020). "Khushqadam, al-Malik al-Ẓāhir". In Fleet, Kate; Krämer, Gudrun; Matringe, Denis; Nawas, John; Rowson, Everett (eds.). Encyclopaedia of Islam (3rd ed.). Brill Online. ISSN 1873-9830.
- Houtsma, M. Th (1987). E.J. Brill's First Encyclopaedia of Islam 1913-1936. BRILL. ISBN 9789004082656.

Regnal titles
| Preceded by Shihab al-Din Ahmad | Mamluk Sultan of Egypt; 28 June 1461–9 October 1467 | Succeeded by Sayf al-Din Bilbay |
