= Inal (name) =

Inal is both a given name and a surname. In the Turkish context the name Inal is a product of an onomastic-hygiene movement initiated following the formation of the Turkish Republic to replace Arabic name; Emin with which it shares common meaning, ‘to believe.’

Notable people with the name include:

Given name

- İnal Batu (1936–2013), Turkish diplomat and politician
- Inal Dzhioyev (born 1969), Russian footballer
- Inal Getigezhev (born 1987), Russian footballer
- Inal Pukhayev (born 1992), Russian footballer

Surname

- Sayf ad-Din Inal (1381–1461), Burji Sultan of Egypt reigned 1453–1461
- Ibrahim Inal (died 1060), Seljuk warlord
- Sid Ahmed Inal (1931–1956), Algerian activist
- Bülent İnal (born 1973), Turkish actor
