= İnan =

İnan is a Turkish name. It is used as both given name and surname. In the Turkish context the given name Inan is a product of an onomastic-hygiene movement initiated following the formation of the Turkish Republic to replace Arabic name Emin with which it shares common meaning, ‘to believe.’ The other Turkish given name which has the same meaning and was derived as a result of the same process is Inal.

Notable people with the name include:

== Surname ==
- Afet İnan, Turkish historian and sociologist
- Helga Nadire İnan Ertürk (born 1984), Turkish-German women's footballer
- Jale İnan, Turkish archaeologist
- Kâmran İnan, Turkish politician
- Kerem İnan, Turkish footballer
- Selçuk İnan, Turkish footballer
- Serkan İnan, Swedish basketball player
- Umran Inan, Turkish scientist

== Given name ==
- Abu Inan Faris, Marinid ruler
