= Timurbugha =

Sultan of Egypt and Syria (r. 5 dec 1467–30 Jan 1468)

- al-Malik al-Zāhir

Sultan of Egypt and Syria
- Reign: 5 December 1467 – 30 January 1468
- Predecessor: Sayf ad-Din Bilbay
- Successor: Qaitbay
- Born: Unknown
- Died: 1475; Damietta
Names
- Sultan, al-Malik al-Zāhir Timurbugha

Al-Malik al-Zahir Timurbugha al-Rumi (died 1475) was the seventeenth Burji Sultan of Mamluk Egypt, briefly ruling from late 1467 to early 1468 when he was deposed. He used the title of al-Malik al-Zāhir.

== Biography ==
Timurbugha was of Greek or Albanian descent. He was brought in c. 1421 by a merchant to Shahin Al-Zardakash, na'ib of Tripoli, then he was taken to Sayf ad-Din Jaqmaq. He then became a Hazinedar during the reign of the latter in c. 1442. He later led the defence against the Mamluks of Sayf ad-Din Inal who managed eventually to depose Al-Mansur Fakhr-ad-Din Uthman. Later on, he was imprisoned in Alexandria for five years, then in Nimrod Castle for six years. In c. 1458, he was released by Inal to accompany the pilgrims to Mecca.

In c. 1461, he returned to Cairo during the reign of Khushqadam, in which he held several positions until the sultan's death. Sayf ad-Din Bilbay had ruled briefly in late 1467, before Timurbugha became the new sultan on 5 December 1467. Timurbugha was well educated and excelled in law, history, literature and poetry. During his reign, political prisoners were released from Alexandria, including Al-Mu'ayyad Shihab al-Din Ahmad.

However, his reign lasted less than two months, as he was dethroned in a palace coup on 30 January 1468. Qaitbay, atabak appointed by Timurbugha, managed to defeat the rebels led by Khairbek and free Timurbugha who later retired in Damietta until his death in 1475.

== Sources ==
- Natho, Kadir I. (2009). Circassian History. Xlibris Corporation. ISBN 9781465316998.
- Petry, C.F. (1993). Twilight of majesty: the reigns of the Mamlūk Sultans al-Ashrāf Qāytbāy and Qānṣūh al-Ghawrī in Egypt. Seattle.
- Schultz, Warren C. (2017). "Mamluk Coins, Mamluk Politics and the Limits of the Numismatic Evidence". In Ben-Bassat, Yuval (ed.). Developing Perspectives in Mamluk History: Essays in Honor of Amalia Levanoni. BRILL. ISBN 978-9004340466.
