= Sid Ahmed Inal =

Inal Ahmed
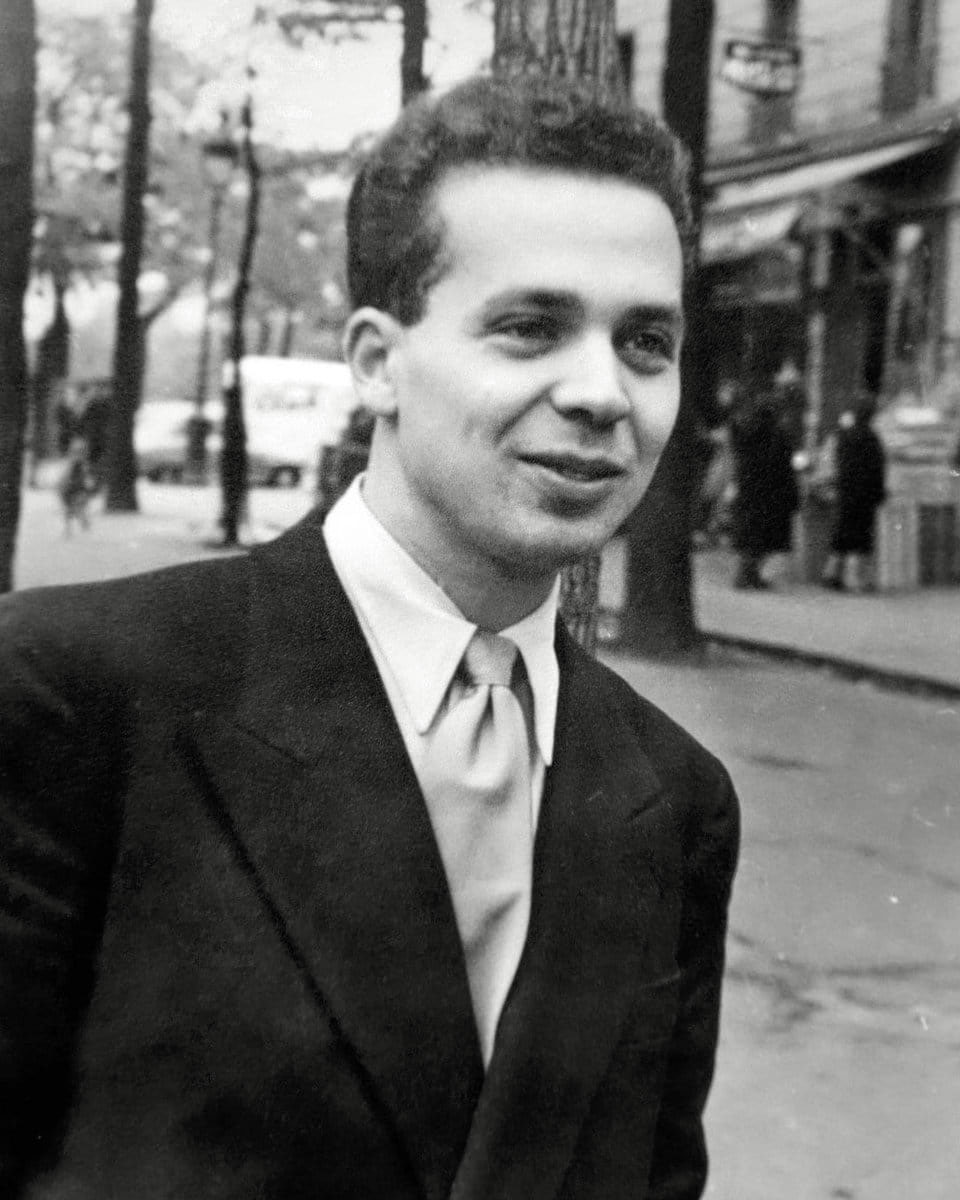
- Born: February 21, 1931; Tlemcen
- Died: November 1, 1956 (aged 25)
- Citizenship: Algerian

Sid Ahmed Inal also known by his war surname Djaâfar, was an Algerian activist and teacher. He was born on February 21, 1931, in Tlemcen. He died on November 1, 1956, in Ben Badis (Province of Sidi Bel Abbès), after being captured and tortured by the French army during the Algerian War.

== Biography ==
Inal began his professional career as a teacher in his native region. Later, he pursued studies in history at the Sorbonne in Paris, where he became the leader of the Algerian Communist student group. It was there that he contributed to the founding of the General Union of Algerian Muslim Students (UGEMA) in 1955.

Upon his return to Algeria, Inal became a teacher at the Tlemcen College in Slane (now named Ibn Khaldoun) and joined the National Liberation Army (ALN); he became an officer and secretary of the command of the fifth wilaya (Oran) in the maquis in Algeria. While he was with the fifth wilaya maquis, he was injured in combat in the Battle of Tadjmout, before being captured by the French army. He was tortured and then killed by French soldiers on November 1, 1956.

== Legacy ==
Many buildings and places bear the name of Ahmed Inal to honor his memory:

- A high school bears his name in Sidi Bel Abbes
- A boulevard bears his name in Tlemcen
- A middle school bears his name in Bouhanak Jadida, Mansourah, Tlemcen
- A poem by Anna Gréki, "Because of the Color of the Sky," dedicated to Inal
