= André Raymond =

André Raymond (7 August 1925 –18 February 2011) was professor emeritus at the University of Provence. He was an expert on the history of the city in the Arab world.

== Childhood, education, and influences ==
André Raymond grew up in a modest family in the Loiret department. He attended the Sorbonne University in Paris, where he earned a *licence ès lettres* (bachelor’s degree in the humanities) in 1944. He continued his studies by obtaining a teaching degree (*licence d'enseignement*) in history in 1945. In 1947, he passed the *agrégation*—a competitive examination for high-level teaching positions.

May 1986 he created Institute of researchers on Arab world studies. IREMAM.

== Honours and awards ==
=== Honours ===
- 1983 : Knight of the Legion of Honour (France)
- 1981 : Officier of the Ordre des Palmes académiqueHe continued his studies by obtaining a teaching degree (*licence d'enseignement*) in history in 1945.s (France)
- 1979 : Commander of the National Order of Merit of Tunisia
- 1975 : Officier of the Order of Civil Merit of the Syrian Arab Republic (Syria)
- 1969 : Officier of the Order of Merit (Egypt)

=== Awards ===
- 2003 : IRCICA award.
- 2002 : Lewis Galantiere prize.
- 1998 : Medal of Honor of Tunis University.
- 1980 : CNRS Silver Medal.
- 1978 : Prix Bordin of the Académie des Inscriptions et Belles-Lettres.

== Career ==
Raymond was director of the French Institute for Arab Studies in Damascus, and of the Institute for Research and Study on the Arab and Islamic World, in Aix-en-Provence. At the time of his death he was professor emeritus at the University of Provence.

Raymond was an expert on the city in the Arab world about which he wrote several books. In 2002 his essays and articles on the subject were collected for a volume in the Variorum Collected Studies series titled Arab cities in the Ottoman period: Cairo, Syria and the Maghreb.

== Death ==
Raymond died on 18 February 2011.

== Selected publications ==
- La Tunisie. Paris, 1961.
- The great Arab cities in the sixteenth to eighteenth centuries: An introduction. New York University Press, 1984. (Hagop Kevorkian Series on Near Eastern Art and Civilization) ISBN 0814773915
- Le Caire. 1993.
- Cairo: City of history. Cairo: American University in Cairo Press. (Translator Willard Wood) ISBN 9774246608
- Raymond, A. (2000). Cairo. Harvard University Press. ISBN 0674003160.
- Arab cities in the Ottoman period: Cairo, Syria and the Maghreb. Ashgate Variorum, 2002. (Variorum Collected Studies series) ISBN 978-0-86078-874-4
