= Sayf al-Din Inal =

Sultan of Egypt and Syria from 1453 to 1461

- Al-Malik al-Ashraf
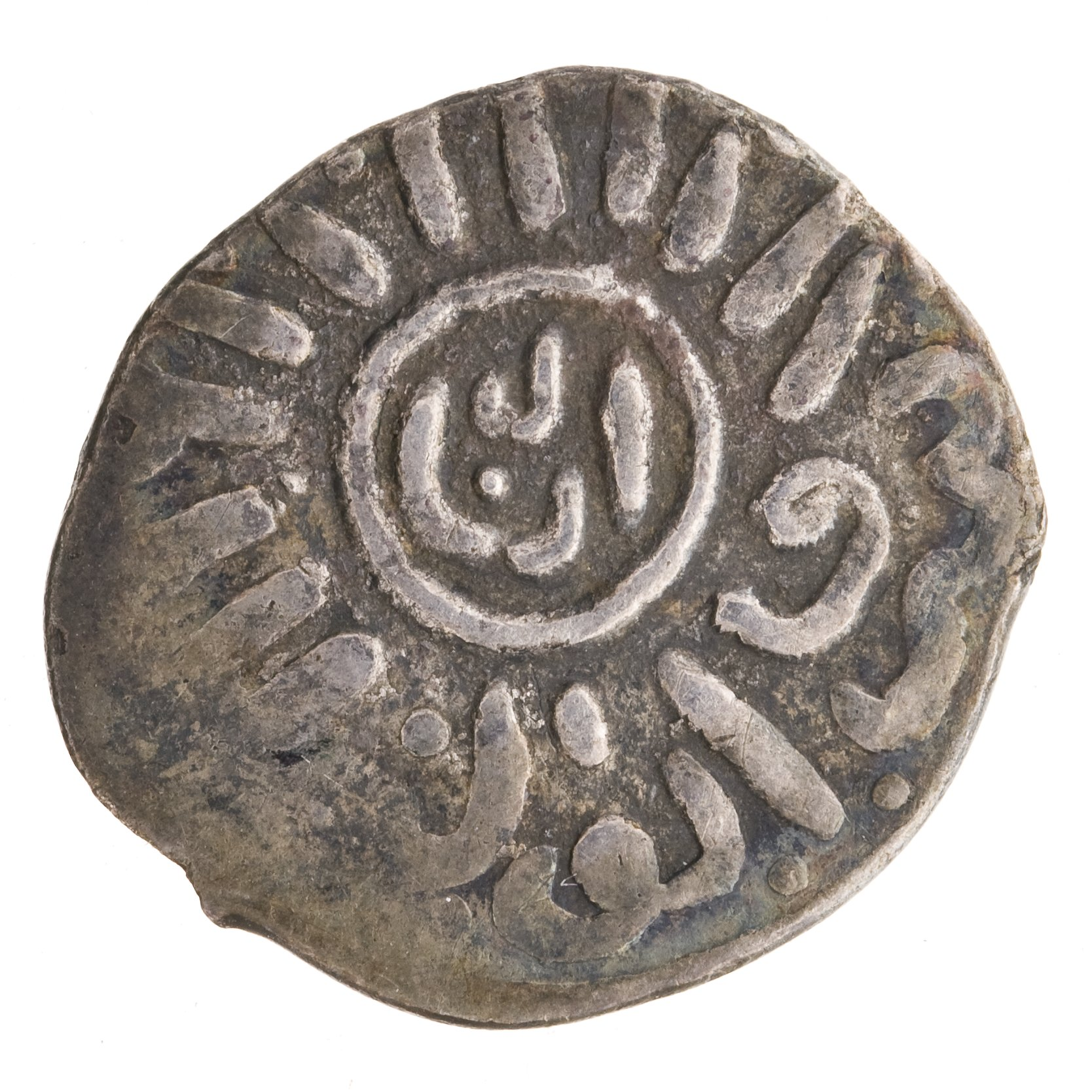
- Silver dirham of Sayf al-Din Inal

Sultan of Egypt and Syria
- Reign: 1453–1461
- Coronation: 1453, Cairo
- Predecessor: Az-Zahir Sayf al-Din Jaqmaq al-'Ala'i
- Successor: Al-Mu'ayyad Shihab al-Din Ahmad
- Born: 1381; Cairo, Egypt
- Died: 26 February 1461 (aged 79–80); Cairo
- Burial: Cairo
- Spouse: Khawand Zaynab
- Issue: Al-Mu'ayyad Shihab al-Din Ahmad; Muhammad; Khawand Badriya; Khawand Fatima
- Dynasty: Burji
- Religion: Sunni Islam

Al-Malik al-Ashraf Sayf al-Din Abu an-Nasr Inal al-'Ala'i az-Zahiri an-Nasiri al-Ajrud (better known as Sayf al-Din Inal; also spelled Saif al-Din Aynal; 1381 – 26 February 1461) was the 13th Burji Mamluk sultan of Egypt, ruling between 1453–1461.

== Early life and career ==
Sayf al-Din Inal was born in Cairo in 1381 to a Circassian merchant father. He was originally bought by trader Ala' al-Din, who gave him the nisbah "al-Ala'i." Ala' al-Din sold Inal to Sultan az-Zahir Barquq, founder of the Burji dynasty, in 1397, hence his second nisbah "az-Zahiri." Inal undertook military training during his service with Barquq.

Following Barquq's death, Sultan an-Nasir Faraj emancipated Inal and enlisted him in his khassakiyah ("personal retinue"). Inal thereby acquired the additional nisbah "an-Nasiri." He gained the nickname "al-Arjud" because of the scantiness of his beard. Under the short-lived sultanate of Ahmad ibn Shaykh in 1421, he was made "emir of ten [mamluks]." He was later promoted to the rank of "emir of drums" by Sultan Barsbay in 1422.

Inal continued to rise through the military's ranks, distinguishing himself as a commander, according to historian Moshe Sharon. In 142,7 Barsbay promoted Inal to "emir of forty." In 1428 he was appointed na'ib ("governor" or "viceroy") of Gaza. During his term as na'ib, Inal was praised for the "justice" of his rule by Bertrandon de la Brocquière who visited the city in 1432. Inal had the minaret of the Kateb al-Welaya Mosque restored on 30 July 1432. Later in 1432, he took part in the Mamluk campaign against the Aq Qoyunlu confederation of Amid (Diyarbakir) alongside Sultan Barsbay.

As a reward for his efforts in the Amid campaign, in 1433, Barsbay promoted Inal to "emir of one hundred, commander of one thousand" in Cairo. He was also reassigned as na'ib of Ruha (Edessa), a post which he reluctantly accepted, literally refusing the new assignment in the morning then relenting before the end of the day. Towards the end of Barsbay's rule, in 1437, Inal was appointed na'ib of Safad.

During the sultanate of Jaqmaq, in 1442, Inal was appointed to the high-ranking post of dawadar kabir ("grand executive secretary") and became a member of the ruling council. In 1445, Sultan Jaqmaq made him atabik al-asakir ("commander-in-chief of the armies.") On 2 July 1450, Inal, Jaqmaq, and Tamam bin Abd al-Raziq, the emir al-majlis ("Commander of the Council"), were encircled by the julban on their way to the citadel. The julban demanded the release of ten mamluks recently dismissed upon Tanam's orders. Inal managed to appease them, promising the release of the mamluk prisoners. Before reaching the citadel, they came across Zayn al-Din Yahya, the ustadar ("major-domo") and a leading figure of the julban, and beat him with their cudgels, forcing him to flee. The detained mamluks were freed the following day.

== Reign ==
=== Ascension to the sultanate ===
Jaqmaq abdicated the sultanate in 1453 in favor of his 18-year-old son, al-Mansur Uthman, and died later that year. Under pressure from powerful mamluks who refused to recognize Uthman's authority, Inal agreed to lead a revolt against the new sultan. On 12 March, his forces besieged the Cairo Citadel, arrested all of the royal emirs and officially renounced their loyalty to Uthman, demanding the installation of Inal as sultan. The 15th-century Egyptian historian Ibn Taghribirdi noted that most of the city's residents conducted their business as usual, while some went to Rumayla Square to "enjoy the sight of battle."

Despite having a much larger force, most of Uthman's Zahiri mamluks abandoned their support for him by 16 March when the Caliph al-Qa'im and the top qadis ("judges") passed a resolution stripping Uthman of his executive authority. Inal, at age 73, was thereby proclaimed sultan and entered the citadel later that week, capturing Uthman. On 9 April Inal had Uthman imprisoned in Alexandria.

=== Internal unrest ===
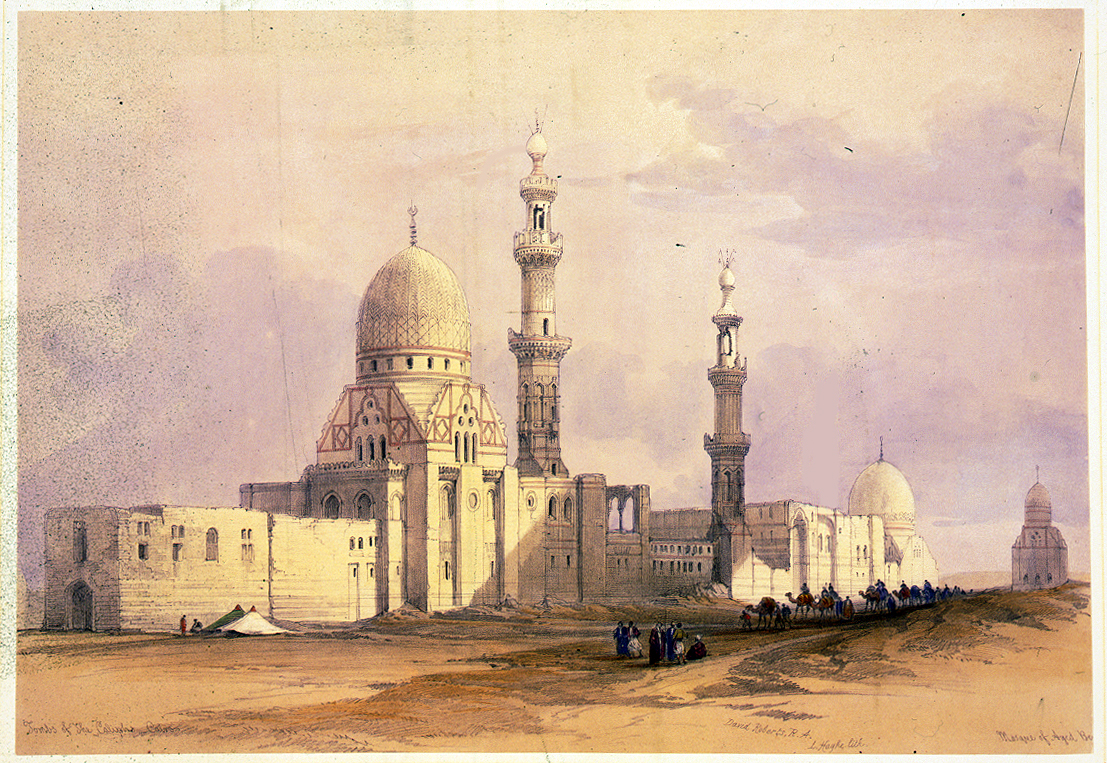
View of Sultan Inal complex, by David Roberts, 1839, in The Holy Land, Syria, Idumea, Arabia, Egypt, and Nubia

Inal's reign was particularly noted by historians for the severe absence of restraint among the roughly 1,000 mamluks under his direct authority, known as the julban or ajlab. The julban were responsible for mass disturbances throughout the sultanate. While Inal and his close circle of officials were notably less tyrannical and brutal than their predecessors, the transgressions of the julban created an environment of fear and insecurity. According to historian Sir William Muir, "for the first time both the rich and the poor had to protect their properties by trench and wall." Because of the frequent raids of markets and shops, many store owners closed their businesses to protect and protest the actions of the mamluks.

On 15 June 1455, Inal faced a mutiny by roughly 500 of his Circassian mamluks after assembling them to launch an expedition against Bedouin tribesmen invading al-Buhayra Province (the Delta region.) Inal had rejected their requests for customary camels as a result of the poor economic conditions of the sultanate. Consequently, the mamluks rallied in Cairo's horse market, refusing to participate in the expedition. Being leaderless, the mutineers were organized and directed by the higher ranking mamluks. They attempted to assassinate Yunus al-Aqba'i, Inal's executive secretary, as he departed from the Cairo Citadel, but his bodyguards warded off the attackers, wounding a few of them. The mutineers were then joined by the recently dismissed Zahiris (the faction which Inal originally hailed from) and subsequently besieged the citadel, demanding higher salaries and the handing over of Yunus. Afterward, Inal sent disciplinary officers to assuage the mamluks' concerns, but to no avail. The mamluks proceeded to raid Yunus's house, but were unsuccessful and returned to the horse market. There, Inal sent a herald to offer the mamluks amnesty and their wounded compensation, but they refused and severely beat the herald. After the mamluks blocked the street to the citadel preventing the royal emirs from leaving. Inal dispatched four emirs to negotiate with the mamluks, but they were taken hostage until their demands were met.

The mutiny convinced Caliph al-Qa'im to abandon his support for Inal and join the uprising. With the caliph providing symbolic legitimacy to the mamluks, they took up arms and assaulted the citadel. Finding himself faced with no alternatives, Inal launched an offensive against the mutineers. The Royal Mamluk Guard of the citadel resisted the rebels and eventually dispersed the Zahiris. Inal had al-Qa'im arrested and imprisoned in Alexandria. He was replaced by al-Mustanjid. All mamluks with the exception of the royal guard were removed from their positions in the citadel, and some of the mutineers were either imprisoned or exiled. Despite the insurrection, Inal supplied the mamluks with the camels they sought, and the expedition to al-Buhayra was carried out.

The young mamluk soldiers mutinied again in December 1456 demanding increased pay, to which Inal bowed without resistance or punishment. Inal was generally unable to quell the countrywide unrest carried out by the mamluks. Several of the sultan's emirs were assaulted, and cities and towns were raided. Worshipers, including women, were harassed at the Mosque of Amr ibn al-As. In one incident the sultan himself was chased and attacked with stones, forcing him to briefly flee into the citadel's harem.

=== Foreign policy ===
Friendly relations between Burji Egypt and the expanding Ottoman Empire were fostered during Inal's reign. The Ottomans' capture of Constantinople and later conquests of Serbia were well received in Cairo which hosted several festivities celebrating the Byzantine capital's fall to fellow Muslims. In addition to several visits between the gift-carrying ambassadors of the two sultanates, Inal sent his personal congratulations to Mehmed II in a poem and versified dispatch.

In June 1457, Inal sent an expeditionary force to retake Tarsus and Adana from the Karamanids of central Anatolia. After the destructive sieges against the Karamanid cities of Caesarea and Konya, the Karamanids surrendered and dispatched an ambassador to Cairo to sign a peace treaty with the sultan in April 1458. Friendly ties between Egypt and the various states of Asia Minor were established.

Also in 1458, Inal received James II in the royal palace of Cairo. James was the illegitimate son of King John II and, following the latter's death, attempted to wrest his father's throne from his half-sister Charlotte. Inal decorated him with a "robe of honor" and promised to install him as King of Cyprus. However, after Queen Charlotte offered a larger annual tribute to Cairo, Inal relented and issued a firman recognizing the queen's authority over Cyprus. Consequently, the mamluk guards protested and attacked the Cypriot embassy in Cairo in protest against Inal's decree. As slave-soldiers they found sympathy with James' cause, not considering him an "illegitimate" heir to his father's throne. As the uprising grew, Inal bowed to mamluk pressure and ordered the preparation of a large naval fleet to place James as King of Cyprus.

The naval fleet, which carried 650 mamluks from the Royal Guard, was launched on 5 August 1460. The campaign failed to install James as king after Queen Charlotte received military assistance from Pope Pius II and the County of Savoy. Nonetheless, James managed to capture parts of the island kingdom with the mamluk force.

=== Public works ===
Sultan Inal was particularly known to be concerned with urban planning in Cairo. In 1457 Inal commissioned the construction of two hamaams ("public baths") and a large rab ("communal residence") in the Bayn al-Qasrayn District. While these projects were underway, he decided to widen the Qasaba, which had served as Cairo's main thoroughfare. To widen the road, he ordered the demolition of several older structures that constricted the flow of traffic. Ibn Taghribirdi commended the project, writing that it greatly benefited the general public.

On a visit to the important Bulaq port along the banks of the Nile River on 28 March 1458, Inal was repulsed at the scene of its crowded and dilapidated buildings and structures. The next day, he issued a decree banning construction in Bulaq and the adjacent Arwa Island due to the narrowness of the roads there. While the royal council voiced opposition to Inal's moves, Ibn Taghribirdi asserted that it would ease the public's access to the port and that the rights of some individuals should not infringe on the rights of others.

=== Succession and death ===
A plague spread to Cairo in 1460, killing thousands of its inhabitants, including roughly 1,400 of the royal mamluks. Inal and his ajlab council decided to allocate the fiefs of the landowners who perished to themselves. The ajlab amassed huge quantities of fiefs, and largely held on to them until the rise of Sultan Khuskhadam in mid-1461.

Inal was reported to be ill on 3 February 1461. Afterward, he summoned Caliph al-Mustanjid and his legal scholars. He conveyed to them his will that Ahmad, his eldest son and emir al-hajj ("commander of the pilgrimage [to Mecca]"), should succeed him. As a result. Inal abdicated the sultanate, and on 25 February, Ahmad was proclaimed sultan, receiving homage in the royal Hall of Audience. On 26 February, Inal died at the age of 80 after a reign of seven years and eleven months.

Ahmad ruled for four months before peacefully abdicating on 28 June as a result of pressure from an alliance of powerful mamluk factions opposed to his leadership, including the Zahiris, Ashrafis, Nasiris, and his own Mu'ayyadis. They were led by the Turkish Khushkadam, who became sultan in Ahmad's stead.

== Bibliography ==
- Hawting, G.R. (2007). Muslims, Mongols and Crusaders. Routledge. ISBN 978-0415450966.
- Levanoni, Amalia (1995). A Turning Point in Mamluk History: The Third Reign of Al-Nāṣir Muḥammad Ibn Qalāwūn (1310–1341). BRILL. ISBN 9004101829.
- Muir, W. (1896). The Mameluke; or, Slave dynasty of Egypt, 1260–1517, A. D. Smith, and Elder. "Othman Inal Sultan."
- Natho, Kadir I. (2010). Circassian History. Xlibris Corporation. ISBN 978-1441523884.
- Raymond, A. (2000). Cairo. Harvard University Press. ISBN 0674003160. "Uthman Inal Sultan."
- Sharon, M. (2009). Handbook of Oriental Studies: Handbuch der Orientalistik. The Near and Middle East. Corpus Inscriptionum Arabicarum Palaestinae (CIAP). BRILL. ISBN 978-90-04-17085-8.
- Van Donzel, E.J. (1994). Islamic Desk Reference. BRILL. ISBN 9004097384. "Aynal 1381."
