= Chronology of the Crusades after 1400 =

The chronology of the Crusades after 1400 provides a detailed timeline of the Crusades and considers the Crusades of the 15th century. This continues the chronology of the later Crusades through 1400. In the Middle East, the threats to the Christian West were from the Mamluks, the Timurids and the Ottomans. The latter would also threaten Eastern Europe and would emerge as the primary Islamic dynasty opposing the West. The Byzantine Empire would no longer exist, but the Reconquista was working well and would be resolved by the end of the 15th century. The works of Norman Housley, in particular, describe the Crusading movement in this timeframe, the impact of the fall of Constantinople in 1453, and the manifestation of Crusading propaganda.

== Chronologies of the Crusades in print ==
Numerous chronologies of the Crusades have been published and include the following.

- A Chronology of the Crusades, covering the crusades from 1055–1456, by Timothy Venning.
- Chronology and Maps, covering 1095–1789, in The Oxford History of the Crusades, edited by Jonathan Riley-Smith.
- A Chronological Outline of the Crusades: Background, Military Expeditions, and Crusader States, covering 160–1798, in The Routledge Companion to the Crusades, by Peter Lock.
- A Narrative Outline of the Crusades, covering 1096-1488, ibid.
- The Crusades: A Chronology, covering 1096–1444, in The Crusades—An Encyclopedia, edited by Alan V. Murray.
- Important Dates and Events, 1049–1571, in History of the Crusades, Volume III, edited by Kenneth M. Setton.
- Oxford Reference Timelines: Byzantine Empire, 330 – c. 1480; Ottoman Empire, c. 1295 – 1923.

== Incumbent rulers in 1400 ==
At the start of the 15th century, the rulers of the relevant countries, orders and dynasties were as follows.

=== Western Europe and Byzantium ===
- 19 September 1380. Charles VI (the Beloved) becomes king of France.
- 6 April 1385. John of Aviz (John I) becomes king of Portugal.
- 31 March 1387. Sigismund of Luxembourg is crowned king of Hungary. He will later become Holy Roman Emperor in 1433, filling the position vacant since 1378.
- 2 November 1389. Boniface IX is elected pope.
- 9 October 1390. Henry the Suffering (Henry III) becomes king of Castile and León.
- 16 February 1391. Manuel II Palaiologos begins his reign as Byzantine emperor.
- 30 November 1393. Conrad of Jungingen is elected Grand Master of the Teutonic Knights.
- 19 May 1396. Martin the Humane (Martin of Aragon) becomes king of Aragon.
- (Date unknown) 1396. Philibert de Naillac is elected Grand Master of the Knights Hospitaller.
- 30 September 1399. Henry IV of England, son of John of Gaunt, becomes king after the deposition of Richard II of England.

=== Muslim World ===
- 9 April 1370. Timur becomes emir of the Timurid Empire.
- 16 June 1389. Bayezid I becomes Ottoman sultan after the death of Murad I at the Battle of Kosovo.
- 3 October 1392. Muhammad VII of Granada becomes sultan of the Emirate of Granada.
- 19 March 1398. Abu Sa'id Uthman III becomes Marinid sultan of Morocco
- June 1399. An-Nasir Faraj becomes Mamluk sultan after the death of his father Barquq.

== Events from the late 14th century ==
A number of events from the late 14th century are key to the later timelines, including the following.

- 15 June 1389. At the Battle of Kosovo, armies under Lazar of Serbia and Murad I meet. Both armies are destroyed and their commanders killed.
- July 1391. Ottoman invasion of Anatolia stopped at the Battle of Kırkdilim.
- 26 April 1394. The military Order of Alcántara organizes the failed Crusade of 1394 against Granada.
- 17 May 1395. Bayezid's invasion of Wallachia is stopped at the Battle of Rovine.
- Spring/Summer 1396. Hungary organizes the Crusade of Nicopolis to relieve the pressure on Constantinople.
- 25 September 1396. Ottomans defeat the allied Western forces at the Battle of Nicopolis.

== 15th century ==
=== 1400 ===
- October–November. Timurids defeat the Mamluks at the Sack of Aleppo.
- (Date unknown). Siege of Damascus results in a Timurid victory over the Mamluks.

1402

- 20 July. Timurids defeat the Mamluks at the Battle of Ankara.
- 20 July. Bayezid I and Olivera Despina captured at Ankara, beginning Ottoman Interregnum.
- (Date unknown). Siege of Constantinople ends with the Byzantines remaining in control of the city.
- December. Timurids take the city from the Hospitallers at the Siege of Smyrna.

1404

- 17 October. Innocent VII elected pope.

1405

- 14 February. Timur dies, Shah Rukh becomes ruler of Timurid Empire.
- 24 June. Innocent VII directs action against the heretical teachings of the Hussites.

1406

- 30 November. Gregory XII elected pope.
- (Date unknown). Forces commanded by Henry III of Castile defeat Muhammad VII of Granada at the Battle of Collejares.
- 25 December. John II of Castile becomes king after the death of his father Henry III.

1408

- 12 December. Sigismund of Luxembourg and his wife Barbara von Cilli found the Order of the Dragon to fight the Turks.

1409

- 30 June. Martin I of Sicily defeats forces of Arborea at the Battle of Sanluri.
- 6 August. Polish–Lithuanian–Teutonic War begins.
- (Date unknown). John I of Portugal plans the invasion of Ceuta, supported by Edward the Eloquent and Henry the Navigator.

=== 1410 ===
- 15 June. Ottoman prince and claimant to the throne Süleyman Çelebi defeats his brother Musa Çelebi at the Battle of Kosmidion.
- 15 July. At the Battle of Grunwald, allies Władysław II Jagiełło and Vytautas defeat the Teutonic Knights under Ulrich von Jungingen, with most of their leadership killed or taken prisoner.
- 26 July. After Grunwald, the Poles and Lithuanians unsuccessfully attempt to take the Teuton's capital in the Siege of Marienburg.
- 16 September. Ferdinand I of Aragon takes the city in the Battle of Antequera, the first such victory against the Muslims in 50 years.
- (Date unknown). Álvaro de Luna becomes key advisor to John II of Castile.

1411

- 1 February. Peace of Thorn is signed ending the Polish–Lithuanian–Teutonic War.
- 3 September. Treaty of Selymbria is concluded between Musa Çelebi and Venice.
- (Date unknown). Sixth Siege of Gibraltar left the territory under Granadan control.

1412

- Early. Mehmed Çelebi defeated by Musa Çelebi at the Battle of İnceğiz.
- 23 May. Death of an-Nasir Faraj leads to a series of ineffectual Mamluk sultans through 1422.

1413

- 20 March. Henry V of England becomes king after the death of his father Henry IV.
- 5 July. Mehmed Çelebi defeats Musa Çelebi at the Battle of Çamurlu.
- 5 July. Mehmed I becomes Ottoman sultan, ending the Interregnum.

1414

- Summer. Hunger War conducted between Poland and Lithuania against the Teutonic Knights.
- 16 November. Council of Constance begun, to last until 1418.

1415

- 5 June. The Council of Constance condemns the writings of John Wycliffe and Jan Hus.
- 4 July. Gregory XII abdicates.
- 6 July. Jan Hus is burned at the stake in Konstanz.
- 21 August. John I of Portugal completes the Conquest of Ceuta, beginning the series of Moroccan–Portuguese conflicts.

1416

- 29 May. Venetian admiral Pietro Loredan destroys the Ottoman fleet at the Battle of Gallipoli.
- 30 May. Hussite Jerome of Prague burned at the stake as a heretic.

1417

- 11 November. Martin V elected pope, ending the Great Schism of 1378–1417.
- (Date unknown). Mircea the Elder loses Dobruja to the Ottomans, preventing Wallachia from becoming an Ottoman province.

1418

- (Date unknown). Martin V authorizes of a crusade against Africa to combat the slave trade.

1419

- 30 July. First Hussite Crusade begins.
- 13 August. Marinid sultan Abu Said Uthman III launches the unsuccessful Siege of Ceuta to recapture the city from Portuguese led by Pedro de Menezes.
- 14 August. Hussite forces begin the Battle of Vyšehrad against crusaders sent by Sigismund leading to a Hussite victory on 1 November.
- 6 November. Ottoman–Venetian peace treaty signed ending a short conflict and confirming Stato da Màr and stipulating the rules of maritime trade between them.

=== 1420 ===
- 25 May. Henry the Navigator is appointed governor of the Military Order of Christ.
- 12 June – 14 July. Hussite forces of Jan Žižka defeat those of the Holy Roman Empire at the Battle of Vítkov Hill.
- 30 June. Oldřich II of Rosenberg and Lipolt Krajíř are defeated by the Hussites at the Battle of Tábor.
- 12 July. Crusade of Martin V, to be led by Sigismund, declared against the Ottomans.

1421

- 26 May. Murad II begins his first reign as Ottoman sultan after the death of his father Mehmed I.
- August. Second Hussite Crusade begins.
- 21 December. Hussites defeat German and Hungarian forces at the Battle of Kutná Hora.

1422

- 10 January. Bohemian forces defeated by Jan Žižka at the Battle of Německý Brod.
- 9 March. Third Hussite Crusade begins.
- 1 April. Barsbay, a former slave of the first Burji sultan Barquq, becomes Mamluk sultan.
- 10 June. Byzantines hold off the Ottomans at the Siege of Constantinople. Forces withdrawn after the rebellion of Küçük Mustafa.
- June. Siege of Thessalonica by the Ottomans begins.
- 17 July – 27 September. Teutonic Knights defeated by Poland and Lithuania in the Gollub War, ending with the signing of the Treaty of Melno.
- 1 September. Henry VI of England becomes king following the death of his father Henry V.
- 21 October. With the death of Charles VI, his son Charles VII of France becomes king in unoccupied France.

1423

- 27 April. Orebites faction of the Hussites led by Jan Žižka defeat the Bohemians led by Čeněk of Wartenberg at the Battle of Hořice.
- 18 May. Treaty of Melno is ratified by all parties and approved by Martin V on 10 July.

1424

- 2 June. Coalition of Florence and Milan under Francesco Sforza defeats Braccio da Montone and Niccolò Piccinino in the Battle of L'Aquila.
- Late September. Mamluk Conquest of Cyprus begins.
- 11 October. Prokop the Great takes command of the Hussites after the death of Jan Žižka from the plague.

1425

- July. Alvise Loredan leads Venetian naval operations in defense of Thessalonica and raided the fortress at Ierissos and then Christopolis.

1426

- 16 June. Hussites under Sigismund Korybut and Prokop the Great defeat Catholic forces at the Battle of Aussig.
- June. Fourth Hussite Crusade begins.
- 7 July. Mamluks defeat the Cypriots at the Battle of Khirokitia.
- 18 July. Janus of Cyprus captured, Cyprus becomes a Mamluk tributary state.

1427

- 4 August. Hussites defeat the armies led by Henry Beaufort at the Battle of Tachov.
- (Date unknown). Byzantines defeat the fleet of Carlo I Tocco at the Battle of the Echinades, the last victory of their navy.

1428

- (Date unknown). Henry Beaufort and Philip the Good plan a joint crusade against Bohemia in the midst of the on-going Anglo-French War.
- October. English decision to attack Orléans reduces Philip's support for the Bohemian crusade.

1429

- 29 April. Joan of Arc joins the Siege of Orléans with a relief expedition.
- 17 July. Charles VII of France is crowned.
- (Date unknown). Hafsids mount the Siege of Malta, then withdraw.

=== 1430 ===
- 10 January. Philip the Good founds the Order of the Golden Fleece.
- 23 March. Joan of Arc dictates a letter threatening to lead a crusading army against the Hussites unless they returned to the Catholic Faith.
- 29 March. Murad II captures Thessalonica after the eight-year Siege of Thessalonica.
- 30 May. Joan of Arc burned at the stake in Rouen.
- 11 July. The Hussites defeat the Hungarian-Moravian-Serbian army at the Battle of Trnava.
- (Date unknown). With the surrender of Chalandritsa and Patras to Morea, the Principality of Achaea comes to an end.

1431

- 11 March. Eugene IV elected pope.
- 16 June. Teutonic Knights and Švitrigaila sign the Treaty of Christmemel creating an anti-Polish alliance.
- 1 July. Castilian forces led by Álvaro de Luna defeat Granada at the Battle of La Higueruela.
- 1 August. Fifth Hussite Crusade begins.
- 14 August. Hussites under Prokop the Bald and Sigismund Korybut defeat the forces of Frederick of Brandenburg at the Battle of Domažlice.
- 9 November. Hungarians defeat the Hussites at the Battle of Ilava.
- 13 December. Vlad II Dracul is made a member of the Order of the Dragon.
- 16 December. Henry VI of England is crowned king of France at Notre-Dame de Paris.
- (Date unknown). Polish–Teutonic War begins.

1432

- 19 November. Milan defeats Venice at the Battle of Delebio, part of the Wars in Lombardy.
- 31 August. Lithuanian Civil War begins.
- (Date unknown). Albanian Revolt of 1432–1436 suppressed by the Ottomans. Skanderbeg, son of Albanian rebel Gjon Kastrioti, remains in Ottoman service.

1433

- 31 May. Sigismund is crowned Holy Roman Emperor, becoming the first emperor since the death of his father Charles IV in 1378.
- 14 August. Edward of Portugal becomes king after the death of his father John of Aviz.

1434

- 30 May. Taborites and Obebites led by Prokop the Great and Jan Čapek of Sány are defeated by the Utraquists at the Battle of Lipany.

1435

- 5 August. Filippo Visconti decisively defeats Alfonso V of Aragon at the naval Battle of Ponza. Anfonso is captured.
- 1 September. Sigismund Kęstutaitis decisively defeats Grand Duke Švitrigaila at the Battle of Wiłkomierz.
- 1 December. Peace of Brześć Kujawski signed, ending the Polish–Teutonic War.

1436

- 5 July. Hussite Crusades end with the signing of The Compacts.
- 31 October. Castilian Enrique Pérez de Guzmán fails to capture the stronghold after the Seventh Siege of Gibraltar, drowning during the siege.

1437

- 13 August. Castilian Civil War begins, pitting John II of Castile, Álvaro de Luna and Henry IV of Castile against John II of Aragon and Henry of Villena, sons of Ferdinand of Antequera.
- 13 September – 19 October. Henry the Navigator is defeated by the Marinids at the Battle of Tangier. Ferdinand the Saint Prince is taken captive.

1438

- 14 April. Jahan Shah becomes sultan of the Qara Qoyunlu.
- 10 September. Sayf ad-Din Jaqmaq overthrows Barsbay's son al-Aziz Jamal ad-Din Yusuf to become Mamluk sultan. Yusuf ruled only 87 days.
- 13 September. Alfonso the African becomes king of Portugal after the death of his father Edward of Portugal.

1439

- 4 May. Władysław III of Poland and Zbigniew Oleśnicki defeat the Hussite confederates under Spytko III of Melsztyn at the Battle of Grotniki.

=== 1440 ===
- 1 February. Prussian Confederation is formed to oppose the Teutonic Knights.
- End of April. Hungarians under Ivan Talovac defeat the Ottomans led by Murad II and Ali Bey Evrenosoğlu at the five-month Siege of Belgrade.
- October. Hadım Şehabeddin leads Ottoman blockage at the Siege of Novo Brdo to last until 27 June 1441.
- 29 June. Florentine forces under Francesco Sforza defeat the Milanians led by Niccolò Piccinino in the Battle of Anghiari.

1441

- Early. John Hunyadi appointed as Voivode of Transylvania by Władysław III.

1442

- 18 March. John Hunyadi defeats an Ottoman army at the Battle of Sibiu.
- September. John Hunyadi defeats a second Ottoman army led by Hadım Şehabeddin near the Ialomița River and places Basarab II as ruler of Wallachia.

1443

- 1 January. Eugene IV calls for the Crusade of Varna (1443–1444), an unsuccessful attempt to stop the intrusion of the Ottomans into Central Europe. The crusade was led by Władysław III of Poland, John Hunyadi and Philip the Good.
- 5 June. Ferdinand the Saint Prince dies in captivity in Fez.
- Early November. As part of the Crusade of Varna, John Hunyadi and Đurađ Branković defeat the Ottomans led by Kasim Pasha at the Battle of Niš.
- November. Skanderbeg's Rebellion against the Ottoman occupation of Albania begins.
- 12 December. The Ottomans defeat the Serbian and Hungarian forces at the Battle of Zlatitsa.

1444

- 2 January. The forces of John Hunyadi defeat those of the Ottomans at the Battle of Kunovica, capturing the Ottoman commander Mahmud Çeleb.
- 2 March. Skanderbeg establishes the League of Lezhë.
- 12 June. Murad II makes peace with Hungary and soon abdicates in favor of his son.
- 29 June. League of Lezhë defeats the Ottomans at the Battle of the Plain of Torvioll.
- July/August. Mehmed II becomes Ottoman sultan after the abdication of his father Murad II.
- 10 August – 18 September. The Hospitallers defeat the Ottomans at the first Siege of Rhodes.
- 15 August. The Treaties of Edirne and Szeged are signed between Hungary and the Ottoman Empire.
- 10 November. In the final battle of the Crusade of Varna, the Ottomans under Murad II defeated the crusaders under Władysław III of Poland (killed in action), John Hunyadi and Mircea II of Wallachia at the Battle of Varna.

1445

- 19 May. John II of Aragon is defeated by John II of Castile at the First Battle of Olmedo, ending the Castilian Civil War.
- 10 October. League of Lezhë defeats the Ottomans at the Battle of Mokra.
- (Date unknown) Álvaro de Luna becomes Grand Master of the Order of Santiago.

1446

- September. Murad II returns as Ottoman sultan.
- 27 September. Skanderbeg defeats the Ottomans at the Battle of Otonetë.
- 10 December. Ottomans destroy the Hexamilion wall, and the Despotate of the Morea is turned into an Ottoman vassal state.

1447

- 6 March. Nicholas V elected pope.
- November. Vlad II Dracul and his son Mircea II of Wallachia are assassinated. Vladislav II of Wallachia.
- December. Albanian–Venetian War of 1447–1448 begins.

1448

- 14 May – 31 July. Ottomans defeat the League of Lezhë at the first Siege of Svetigrad.
- 14 August. Albania is victorious over Venice at the first Battle of Oranik.
- 4 October. Peace established between Albania and Venice.
- 17–20 October. Ottomans defeat the Hungarians at the second Battle of Kosovo.
- October–November. Vlad the Impaler serves his first term as Voivode of Wallachia.

1449

- 6 January. Constantine XI Palaiologos is crowned Byzantine Emperor, the last in a line of rulers that can be traced to the founding of Rome.
- 4 May. The Albanian garrison surrenders at the second Siege of Sfetigrad and the Ottomans seize the fortress.
- 20 May. Afonso V of Portugal and Afonso of Braganza suppress the rebellion of Peter of Coimbra at the Battle of Alfarrobeira. Peter died in this battle.

=== 1450 ===
- 26 February. Francesco Sforza enters Milan after a siege, founding a dynasty that will rule Milan for a century.
- 9 May. Timurid emir Abdal-Latif Mirza is assassinated.
- 14 May – 23 November. Albanians defeat the Ottomans at the first Siege of Krujë.
- (Approximate). The Classical Age of the Ottoman Empire begins.

1451

- 3 February. Mehmed II is restored as Ottoman sultan after the death of his father Murad II.
- 26 March. Treaty of Gaeta signed, Skanderbeg becomes a vassal of Naples.
- (Date unknown). The Ottomans conquer Karaman, beginning the long list of Mehmed II's campaigns.
- (Date unknown). Abu Sa'id Mirza becomes sultan of the Timurid Empire.

1452

- 17 March. Castile and Murcia defeat Granada at the Battle of Los Alporchones.
- 19 March. Frederick III of Germany becomes the last Holy Roman Emperor to be crowned in Rome.
- Autumn. Uzun Hasan becomes sultan of the Aq Qoyunlu.

1453

- 1 February. Jaqmaq abdicates and his son al-Mansur Uthman becomes Mamluk sultan. Jaqmaq dies 12 days later.
- 16 March. Sayf ad-Din Inal overthrows Uthman to become Mamluk sultan.
- 22 April. Albanians defeat the Ottomans at the Battle of Polog.
- 29 May. The Fall of Constantinople marks the fall of the Byzantine Empire after Mehmed the Conqueror takes the city in a siege that began on 6 April.
- 28 October. Ladislaus the Posthumous is crowned king of Bohemia, with George of Poděbrady remaining in control of the government.

1454

- 4 February. Thirteen Years' War between Poland and the Teutonic Knights begins.
- 6 March. Casimir IV of Poland renounces allegiance to the Teutonic Knights.
- 9 April. Treaty of Lodi is signed, ending the Wars in Lombardy.
- 22 July. Henry IV of Castile becomes king.
- 18 September. Bernhard von Zinnenberg leads the Teutons to a victory over Casimir IV at the Battle of Chojnice.

1455

- 8 January. Nicholas V publishes Romanus Pontifex, an encyclical to Afonso V of Portugal sanctioning slavery.
- 8 April. Callixtus III elected pope.

1456

- 15 April. Vlad the Impaler begins his second term as Voivode of Wallachia.
- 18 May. Skanderbeg defeats a large Ottoman force sent to capture Albania at the second Battle of Oranik.
- 4–22 July. Crusade of 1456: Hungarians and Serbians defeat the Ottomans in the blockade known as the Siege of Belgrade. The crusade was led by John Hunyadi, Michael Szilágyi and John of Capistrano, defeating Mehmed II, who was wounded, Grand Viziers Zagan Pasha and Mahmud Pasha, and Karaca Pasha, who was killed in action.
- 20 August. Vladislav II of Wallachia is killed by Vlad the Impaler.

1457

- 2 September. Albanian forces under Skanderbeg and defeat the Ottomans led by Isak bey Evrenoz and Hamza Kastrioti at the Battle of Albulena.

1458

- 24 January. Matthias Corvinus (Matthias I Hunyadi) becomes king of Hungary at age 14.
- 19 August. Pius II elected pope.
- 13 September. Stephen the Great becomes Voivode of Moldavia.
- 23 October. Afonso the African completes the Portuguese conquest of Ksar es-Seghir.

1459

- 27 May. Council of Mantua convenes to plan crusade against the Ottomans.
- (Date unknown). Mehmed II's defeat of Stjepan Tomašević at Siege of Smederevo results in the fall of the Serbian Despotate.

=== 1460 ===
- (Date unknown). Ottoman commander Ali Bey Mihaloğlu captures Hungarian regent Michael Szilágyi.

1461

- 26 February. Shihab ad-Din Ahmad becomes Mamluk sultan after the death of his father Sayf ad-Din Inal. He abdicates after only four months.
- 28 June. Sayf ad-Din Khushqadam becomes Mamluk sultan after the abdication of Shihab ad-Din Ahmad.
- 10 July. Stephen Tomašević becomes the last king of Bosnia upon the death of his father Stephen Thomas.
- 22 July. Louis XI of France becomes king upon the death of his father Charles VII.
- July. Graitzas Palaiologos surrenders Salmeniko Castle, the last garrison of the Despotate of the Morea, to Ottoman forces after a year-long siege.
- 15 August. The Empire of Trebizond falls to the Ottomans after the 32-day Siege of Trebizond.

1462

- 17 June. Vlad the Impaler attempts to assassinate Mehmed II at the Night Attack at Târgoviște, forcing him to retreat from Wallachia.
- July. Radu the Handsome replaces his brother Vlad the Impaler as Voivode of Wallachia. Vlad is captured by Matthias Corvinus and imprisoned for 12 years for treason.
- 1 September. Mehmed II captures the town after the Siege of Mytilene, conquering the island of Lesbos.
- 17 September. Poland defeats the Teutons at the Battle of Świecino, part of the Thirteen Years' War.
- (Date unknown). Castilians capture the city after the Eighth Siege of Gibraltar.

1463

- 3 April. Ottoman-Venetian War begins.
- 25 May. Ottoman conquest of Bosnia completed with the death of Stjepan Tomašević.
- 15 September. Prussian Confederation defeats the Teutonic Order in the naval Battle of Vistula Lagoon (Zatoka Świeża).
- 22 September – 25 December. Hungary captures Jajce Fortress in Bosnia from the Ottomans in the first Siege of Jajce.
- 22 October. Ezechielis prophetae issued, calling for a crusade against the Ottomans.

1464

- 10 July – 22 August. Mehmed II is unsuccessful in his attempt to recover the fortress in the second Siege of Jajce.
- 18 July. Crusade of Pius II begins with the departure of the pope for Ancona. Pius II would die on 14 August.
- 30 August. Paul II elected pope.
- 14 September. As Athleta Christi of the Holy See in Pius II's Crusade, Skanderbeg breaks his ten-year peace treaty with the Ottomans signed in 1463, by initiating the Battle of Ohrid. The Albanian–Venetian forces were successful.

1465

- 14 August. Marinid sultan Abd al-Haqq II is murdered in the Moroccan revolution.

1466

- June. Mehmed II begins the second Siege of Krujë, to last nearly 11 months.
- 19 October. Thirteen Years' War ends with the second Peace of Toruń.
- (Date unknown). Juan Alonso de Guzmán takes the city from Castile in the Ninth Siege of Gibraltar.

1467

- 23 April. Skanderbeg, Tanush Thopia and Lekë Dukagjini defeat the Ottomans under Ballaban Badera at Krujë.
- Summer. Albanians defeat the Ottomans at the Third Siege of Krujë.
- 20 August. Henry IV of Castile defeats his half-brother Alfonso of Asturias at the Second Battle of Olmedo.
- 9 October. Sayf ad-Din Khushqadam dies, Bilbay and then Timurbugha serve as Mamluk sultan.
- 30 October or 11 November. Uzun Hasan defeats Jahan Shah at the Battle of Chapakchur.
- 15 December. Stephen the Great halts the advance of Matthias Corvinus at the Battle of Baia. This is the last Hungarian attempt to subdue Moldavia.

1468

- 31 January. Qaitbay becomes Mamluk sultan after Timurbugha is overthrown in a coup.
- 30 June. Catherine Cornaro is married by proxy to James II of Cyprus.
- (Date unknown). Portuguese fleet commanded by Fernando of Viseu razes a region of Morocco in the Anfa Expedition.

1469

- 4 February. Uzun Hasan defeats Timirud emir Abu Sa'id Mirza at the Battle of Qarabagh.
- 19 October. Ferdinand II of Aragon marries Isabella I of Castile.

=== 1470 ===
- 10 July – 5 August. Ottomans capture Euboea after the Siege of Negroponte.
- 20 August. Stephen the Great defeats the Volga Tatars at the Battle of Lipnic.

1471

- 14 July. Muscovy defeats the Novgorods at the Battle of Shelon.
- 9 August. Sixtus IV elected pope.
- 24 August. Portugal defeats Kingdom of Fez resulting in the Conquest of Asilah.
- 29 August. Portugal occupies Tangier.
- (Date unknown). Guillaume Fichet publishes Bessarion's Orations against the Turks, one of the first pieces of mass-propaganda used in Europe.

1472

- (Date unknown). Wattasid dynasty under Abu Abd Allah al-Sheikh Muhammad is founded in Fez following the chaos left by the Moroccan revolution.

1473

- 11 August. Mehmed II defeats the Aq Qoyunlu led by Uzun Hasan at the Battle of Otlukbeli.

1474

- 11 December. Isabella I of Castile becomes queen after the death of her father Henry IV.
- 12 December. Henry IV's death triggers a civil war between Isabella I and her niece Joanna la Beltraneja.

1475

- 10 January. Stephen the Great defeats the Ottomans under Hadım Suleiman Pasha at the Battle of Vaslui.
- June. Vlad the Impaler begins his third term as Voivode of Wallachia.
- (Date unknown). Ottoman forces of Janissaries exceeds 4000 and Sipahi at 40,000.
- (Date unknown). War of the Castilian Succession begins with the Siege of Burgos.
- (Date unknown). Principality of Theodoro falls to the Ottoman Empire, arguably taking with it the final territorial remnant of the Roman Kingdom.

1476

- 1 March. The Catholic Monarchs defeat Afonso V of Portugal and John II of Portugal at the Battle of Toro.
- 26 July. Mehmed II defeats Stephen the Great at the Battle of Valea Albă.

1478

- May. The Ottomans defeat the Venetians at the Siege of Shkodra.
- Spring. The Ottomans are successful in the fourth Siege of Krujë.
- 1 November. The Spanish Inquisition begins.

1479

- 20 January. Ferdinand II of Aragon becomes king and rules together with his wife Isabella I of Castile over Iberia.
- 25 January. Venice and the Ottomans sign the Treaty of Constantinople ceding Shkodra to Mehmed II, bringing all of Albania under Ottoman control.
- 4 September. War of the Castilian Succession ends with the signing of the Treaty of Alcáçovas.
- 13 October. The Hungarians defeat the Ottomans at the Battle of Breadfield.

=== 1480 ===
- 23 May – 17 August. Hospitallers under Pierre d'Aubusson defeat the Ottomans under Mesih Pasha at the second Siege of Rhodes.
- 28 July. An Ottoman army lands near Otranto causing Sixtus IV to call for a crusade.
- 12 August. The Siege of Otranto by the Ottomans under Gedik Ahmed Pasha begins. Ottoman troops behead 800 Christians known as the Martyrs of Otranto for refusing to convert to Islam.
- (Date unknown). Gulielmus Caoursin writes Obsidionis Rhodiæ urbis descriptio, an account of the Siege of Rhodes.

1481

- 8 April. Sixtus IV issues the bull Cogimur iubente altissimo beginning the Otranto Crusade.
- 3 May. Mehmed II dies and is succeeded by Bayezid II on 22 May. His succession is contested by his half-brother Cem Sultan.
- 22 May. The 1481 Rhodes earthquake of magnitude 7.1 strikes, causing an estimated 30,000 casualties.
- 21 June. Sixtus IV issues the bull Aeterni regis confirming the Treaty of Alcáçovas.
- 28 August. John II of Portugal becomes king.
- 10 September. Otranto Crusade ends with the withdrawal of Ottoman forces.
- 15 September. Andreas Palaiologos plans a crusade against the Ottomans.
- (Date unknown). John Caius the Elder translates Caoursin's Obsidionis Rhodiæ urbis descriptio into English.

1482

- 28 February. Alhama de Granada is taken by Christian forces, starting the Granada War.
- 29 July. The imprisonment of Cem Sultan begins at Rhodes. He would remain under Christian control until his death in 1495.

1483

- April. Castile defeats Granada at the Battle of Lucena. Christian forces take Muhammad XI of Granada as prisoner.
- 15 August. The Sistine Chapel, built with ransom paid by Bayezid II for Cem Sultan, celebrates its first mass.
- 30 August. Charles VIII of France becomes king, under the regency Anne of France and Peter II of Bourbon, upon the death of his father Louis XI. The regency will last until Charles' 21st birthday on 30 June 1491.
- October. Matthias Corvinus signs a five-year truce with Bayezid II applying to all of Moldavia except the ports.
- 29 October. The Kingdom of Croatia defeats the Ottomans at the Battle of Una. A seven-year truce is signed between the parties.

1484

- 6–15 July. The Ottomans take the Moldavan fortress after the Siege of Chilia.
- 29 August. Innocent VIII elected pope.
- November. The Hungarians defeat Frederick III at the Battle of Leitzersdorf.
- 5 December. Innocent VIII issues the bull Summis desiderantes affectibus giving the inquisition a mission to hunt heretics and witches.

1485

- 1 June. Matthias Corvinus is successful in the Siege of Vienna, establishing the captured city as his capital.
- 22 August. Henry VII of England becomes king.
- (Date unknown). The Ottoman-Mamluk War begins in Anatolia and Syria.

1486

- 16 February. Maximilian I of Habsburg is elected King of the Romans.

1487

- Early. Muhammad XI of Granada, the last Nasrid ruler of the Emirate of Granada, is released in exchange for placing Granada as a tributary to the Catholic monarchy.
- 27 April. Innocent VIII issues the bull Id Nostri Cordis calling for the Waldensian Crusade to exterminate the Vaudois.
- 7 May – 18 August. Spain conquers the city after the 103-day Siege of Málaga following earlier attacks on Ronda and Vélez-Málaga.
- August. Portugal pillages the Anfa region (Casablanca) of Morocco in the Chaouia Expedition.

1488

- (Date unknown). The Mamluks defeat the Ottomans at the Battle of Aga-Cayiri.

1489

- 14 February. Catherine Cornaro leaves Cyprus completing the Venetian conquest of Cyprus.
- (Date unknown). Al-Zadal (Muhammad XII of Granada) surrenders the city to Spain after the six-month Siege of Baza and is captured.

=== 1490 ===
- (Date unknown). Portugal ravages Moroccan pirate havens in the Sack of Targa and Comice.

1491

- 24 January. Poland and Lithuania defeat the Crimean Khanate under Meñli I Giray at the Battle of Zasław.
- 23 April. Spain begins the Siege of Granada, the final battle of the Reconquisa.
- 7 November. Maximilian I and Vladislaus II sign the Peace of Pressburg, ending the Austrian–Hungarian War.
- 25 November. Treaty of Granada signed, granting the Nasrids two months to withdraw from the city.
- September. The Ottomans are defeated by Croatia at the Battle of Vrpile.
- (Date unknown). The Ottoman-Mamluk War ends with Status quo ante bellum.

1492

- 2 January. Muhammad XI, the last emir of Granada, surrenders his city to the army of the Catholic Monarchs after a lengthy siege, ending the ten-year Granada War and the centuries-long Reconquista, and bringing an end to 780 years of Muslim control in Al-Andalus.
- 6 January. Ferdinand and Isabella enter Granada.
- 31 March. Ferdinand and Isabella sign the Alhambra Decree, expelling all Jews from Spain unless they convert to Christianity.
- 2 August. Bayezid II dispatches the Ottoman Navy to bring expelled Spanish Jews safely to Ottoman lands.
- 6 August. After the death of Innocent VIII on 25 July, the 1492 Papal Conclave is convened, the first held in the Sistine Chapel.
- 11 August. Alexander VI elected pope.
- 12 October. Christopher Columbus' expedition makes landfall in the Caribbean, believing he has reached the East Indies.
- 26 October. Stephan the Great defeats John I of Poland at the Battle of the Cosmin Forest.

1493

- 4 May. Alexander VI issues the bull Inter caetera granting newly discovered lands to Spain. Dudum siquidem clarifies this on 26 September.
- 19 August. Maximilian I succeeds his father Frederick III as Holy Roman Emperor.
- September. The Ottomans defeat Croatia in the Battle of Krbava Field.
- September. Hundred Years' Croatian–Ottoman War begins.

1494

- 25 January. First Italian War begins, pitting Charles VIII of France and the League of Venice.
- (Date unknown). Charles VIII purchases the right to the Byzantine Empire from exiled pretender, Andreas Palaiologos.

1495

- 25 February. Cem Sultan dies on an expedition of Charles VIII to conquer Naples.

1496

- 7 August. An-Nasir Muhammad becomes Mamluk sultan after the death of his father Qaitbay.

1497

- 17 September. The Conquest of Melilla was done by a fleet sent by the Juan Alonso Pérez de Guzmán which attacked the North African city of Melilla.
- (Date unknown). Moldavian Campaign was an unsuccessful attack by John Albert of Poland on Moldavia, supported by the Ottomans, with the objective of deposing Stephen the Great. This would last two years.

1498

- 7 April. Louis XII of France becomes king.
- 31 October. Qansuh becomes Mamluk sultan after an-Nasir Muhammad is killed by his subjects.

1499

- 28 July. The Turkish navy defeats the Venetians at the Battle of Zonchio.
- 18 December. Spanish Muslims begin the first Rebellion of the Alpujarras.

== 16th century ==
=== 1500 ===
- 1 June. Alexander VI issues Quamvis ad amplianda calling for a crusade against the Ottomans following their invasions of Venetian territory in Greece.
- 30 June. Abu Sa'id Qansuh is overthrown and sent into exile. Janbalat becomes the new Mamluk sultan, but reigns for less than six months. He was succeeded by Tuman Bay I on 25 January 1501.
- 24 July. The Ottoman fleet under Admiral Kemal Reis defeats the Venetians in the Battle of Modon.

1501

- 11 April. Rebellion of the Alpujarras is squashed.
- 20 April. Qansuh al-Ghuri becomes the second-to-last Mamluk sultan after Tuman Bay I is overthrown after three months.
- (Date unknown). Safavid Empire of Persia founded by Ismail I.

1502

- 17 September. Forced conversion of Muslims begins in the Crown of Castile by edict of Isabella I.

1503

- 24 June. The Aq Qoyunlu under Sultan-Murad are critically defeated at the Safavids under Ismail I at the Battle of Hamadan.
- 20 August. The treaty between Vladislaus II of Hungary and Bayezid II suppressing warfare along the Hungarian-Ottoman border goes into effect.
- 3 September. The first 1503 Papal Conclave is convened after the death of Alexander VI. Pius III is elected pope and dies a month later.
- 31 October. The second 1503 Papal Conclave elects Julius II as pope.
- (Date unknown). Alexander Jagiellon signs a five-year treaty with Bayezid II, the first of the Polish-Ottoman alliances.

1504

- 2 July. Bogdan III the One-Eyed becomes the new Voivode of Moldavia upon the death of his father Stephen the Great.

1505

- 16 March. The Mamluk-Portuguese conflicts begin with Qansuh al-Ghuri ordering a naval expedition against the Portuguese.

1506

- 6 August. Lithuania defeats the Crimean Khanate at the Battle of Kletsk.

1507

- (Date unknown). Henry VII of England exchanges letters with Julius II to organise an expedition against the Ottomans.
- (Date unknown). Timurid Dynasty ends when Muhammad Shaybani captures their capital Herat. The last Timurid emir Badi' al-Zaman Mirza flees.

1508

- 4 February. Maximillian I of Germany becomes Holy Roman Emperor.
- February. War of the League of Cambrai begins.
- March. A Mamluk fleet defeats the Portuguese at the Battle of Chaul.

1509

- 3 February. The Portuguese fleet defeats the Mamluks at the Battle of Diu.
- 21 April. Henry VIII of England becomes king on the death of his father Henry VII.
- 14 May. France defeats Venice at the Battle of Agnadello.
- 14 September. Ottoman capital devastated by the 1509 Constantinople earthquake.
- (Date unknown). Ottoman Civil War between the sons of Bayezid II, Selim I and Şehzade Ahmed, begins.

=== 1510 ===
- July. The League of Cambrai disbands, leaving only France and Ferrara at war with Venice and the Pope.

1511

- 2–19 January. Papal forces defeat Ferrara at the Siege of Mirandola.
- 2 July. The Şahkulu rebellion in Anatolia against Ottoman rule is suppressed after three months. Şehzade Ahmed, son of Bayezid II, was tasked with the suppression but instead tried to turn his troops against his father and brother.

1512

- 11 April. French and Ferrarese forces defeat the Papal forces at the Battle of Ravenna.
- 24 April. Selim I becomes sultan of the Ottoman Empire upon the abdication of Bayezid II, who dies on 26 May.

1513

- 9 March. Son of Lorenzo de' Medici elected pope, taking the name Leo X.
- 24 April. Şehzade Ahmed, brother of Selim I, is defeated at Yenişehir and executed.
- 6 June. Milanese and Swiss defeat France at the Battle of Novara.
- 16 August. Croatians under Petar Berislavić defeat the Ottomans at the Battle of Dubica.

1514

- 23 August. Selim I defeats the Safavids at the Battle of Chaldiran, placing East Anatolia under Ottoman control for the first time.
- 8 September. Lithuania defeats the Principality of Moscow at the Battle of Orsha.

1515

- 1 January. Francis I of France becomes king, succeeding Louis XII who died without a legitimate son.
- 13 June. Selim I defeats Bozkurt of Dulkadir at the Battle of Turnadag. After taking the Ramadanids, all of the Turkish beyliks are under Ottoman control.

1516

- 24 August. Selim I defeats the Mamluks at the Battle of Marj Dabiq, beginning the second Ottoman-Mamluk War.
- August. Damascus Eyalet established as an administrative division of the Ottoman Empire.
- September/October. Hayreddin Barbarossa and his brother enable the Capture of Algiers.
- 17 October. Tuman Bay II becomes the last Mamluk sultan.
- 28 October. Ottoman forces under Hadım Sinan Pasha defeat the Mamluks at the Battle of Yaunis Khan.
- (Date unknown). Piri Reis joins the Ottoman navy as a captain.

1517

- 22 January. Selim I defeats Tuman Bay II at the Battle of Ridaniya.
- 30 January. Cairo is captured by the Ottomans after a three day battle bringin the Fall of the Mamluks.
- 30 January. The Abbasid Caliphate of Cairo under al-Mutawakkil III falls to the Ottomans. He was the last of the Cairo caliphs and was succeeded by Selim I as the founder of the Ottoman Caliphate.
- After February. The first world map, the Piri Reis map, is presented to Selim I.
- 15 March. The Fifth Council of the Lateran ends.
- 12 April. The Ottomans annex the city after their successful Siege of Jeddah.
- (Date unknown). Leo X plans a crusade against the Ottomans.

1518

- October. Treaty of London, led by Thomas Wolsey, unites the kingdoms of western Europe in the wake of the Ottoman threat.
- January–May. Ottoman admiral Oruç Barbarossa engineers the Fall of Tlemcen.

1519

- 28 June. Charles V of Spain elected as Holy Roman Emperor.
- November. Regency of Algiers asks to join the Ottoman Empire.
- (Date unknown). The first of Celali rebellions in Anatolia begins.

=== 1520 ===
- 30 September. The reign of Suleiman I (the Magnificent) begins.

1521

- 27 January. Suleiman I suppresses a revolt by Janbirdi al-Ghazali, the first governor of Ottoman Damascus.
- 18 May. The campaigns of Suleiman I begin.
- 29 August. After a two-month assault, Suleiman I defeats the Hungarians at the Siege of Belgrade.

1522

- 9 January. Adrian VI elected pope. The only Dutch pope, he will be the last non-Italian elected for more than 450 years.
- 26 June. The second Siege of Rhodes by the Ottomans begins.
- 22 December. Hospitaller Rhodes falls to Suleiman I.

1523

- 1 January. Hospitallers withdraw from Rhodes.
- 27 June. Pargali Ibrahim Pasha is appointed as Grand Vizier by Suleiman I.
- 19 November. Clement VII is elected pope.

1526

- 29 August. Suleiman I defeats Louis II of Hungary at the Battle of Mohács. Louis II dies as he retreats.

1527

- 6 May. Mutinous troops of the Holy Roman Empire cause the Sack of Rome.
- 8 June. The Kalender Çelebi rebellion is crushed by Pargalı Ibrahim Pasha.
- 27 September. Ferdinand I of Austria defeats John Zápolya and takes over most of Hungary at the Battle of Tarcal. John appeals to the Ottomans for help.

1528

- (Date unknown) Genoese admiral Andrea Doria enters the service of Charles V.

1529

- 27 September – 15 October. Suleiman I conducts the unsuccessful Siege of Vienna.
- 29 May. Hayreddin Barbarossa enables the Capture of Peñón of Algiers.

=== 1530 ===
- (Date unknown). Malta granted to the Knights of Rhodes by Holy Roman Emperor Charles V. After resettlement, they becoming the Knights of Malta, with their capital Birgu within what was then known as Hospitaller Malta.

1531

- 16 February. The Portuguese fail to take the city in the first Siege of Diu.

1532

- 5–30 August. The Hungarians stop the Ottoman advance at the Siege of Güns (Közseg).
- (Date unknown). Ottoman–Safavid War of 1532–1555 begins.

1533

- 22 July. Treaty of Constantinople signed between the Ottomans and Austria, a fief of the Holy Roman Empire, concerning the fate of Hungary. János Zápolya becomes king under the suzerainty of Suleiman I.
- (Date unknown). Suleiman I marries Roxelana, a Ruthenian harem girl. She is the first Haseki Sultan and the marriage marks the beginning of the Sultanate of Women.

1534

- May. Jean de La Forêt becomes the first French ambassador to the Ottoman Empire.
- 16 August. Barbarossa is successful in the Conquest of Tunis, taking the city from Hafsid ruler Muley Hasan.
- 13 October. Paul III elected pope.
- December. As part of the Campaign of the Two Iraqs, Suleiman I succeeds in the Capture of Baghdad.

1535

- 1 June. Charles V leads the Reconquest of Tunis, taking the city from the Ottomans. As a result, Barbarossa's fleet is destroyed and nearly 30,000 inhabitants are massacred.
- (Date unknown). Suleiman I begins the rebuilding of the walls around Jerusalem.

1536

- 18 February. Franco-Ottoman alliance established and exempts French merchants from Ottoman law. This was one of the first of the Capitulations of the Ottoman Empire.
- 5 March. Pargalı Ibrahim Pasha executed on Suleiman's orders after a fallout with Roxelana.

1537

- August–September. Suleiman I fails to capture the island at the Siege of Corfu. He does later conquer the islands of Paros and Ios.

1538

- 24 February. The Treaty of Nagyvárad is declared between Ferdinand I of Austria, future Holy Roman Emperor, and the Ottoman Empire.
- 18 July. The Truce of Nice establishes peace between Charles V and Francis I.
- 6 November. The Ottomans fail in the second Siege of Diu.

=== 1540 ===
- September. Gibraltar is sacked by Barbary pirates in the service of the Ottomans. This leads to construction of the defensive Charles V Wall.
- 1 October. A Spanish fleet under the command of Bernardino de Mendoza destroys an Ottoman fleet at the Battle of Alborán.

1541

- 26 April. The Portuguese fail to defeat the Ottomans at the Battle of Suez.
- 4 May – 21 August. Beginning the Little War in Hungary, the Ottomans capture the city after the Siege of Buda and establish rule over much of Hungary.
- October–November. The Holy Roman Empire and Spain fail in their Algiers Expedition.
- (Date unknown). Suleiman I seals off Jerusalem's Golden Gate, likely because of a prophecy that the Messiah would return through this gate to Jerusalem.
- (Dates unknown). The Portuguese engage the Ottomans in numerous conflicts including the Battle of Suakin, the Attack on Jeddah and the Battle of El Tor.

1542

- 8 March. Antoine Escalin des Aimars gains promises of Ottoman aid in a French war against the Holy Roman Empire.
- (Date unknown). The Ottomans repel the Hapsburgs led by at the Siege of Pest. The siege was led by Joachim of Brandenburg.

1543

- 25 July – 10 August. Suleiman I defeats the Hungarians at the Siege of Esztergom.
- 6–22 August. The Ottomans under Barbarossa and French forces take the city after the Siege of Nice
- 3 September. Suleiman I captures the Hungarian coronation city of Székesfehérvár.

1545

- (Date unknown). Francis I of France orders the Waldensians punished for heresy resulting in the Mérindol Massacre.
- (Date unknown). Rüstem Pasha defeats Bagrat III of Imereti at the Battle of Sokhoista, the last attempt of the Georgians to stop the Ottoman advance.

1546

- 10 November. The third Siege of Diu fails to wrest the city from the Portuguese.

1547

- 31 March. Henry II of France becomes king after the death of his father Francis I.
- (Date unknown). The Truce of Adrianople signed between Charles V and Suleiman I the Magnificent in which Ferdinand I of Austria and Charles V recognize total Ottoman control of Hungary.
- (Date unknown). Piri Reis becomes Admiral (Reis) of the Ottoman navy.

1548

- 26 February. The Ottomans achieve the Capture of Aden from the Portuguese.
- (Date unknown). Suleiman I and Rüstem Pasha attack Persian in the second campaign of the Ottoman–Safavid War of 1532–1555 and succeed with the Siege of Van.

1549

- 29 November. Papal Conclave of 1549 convened after the death of Paul III on 10 November.

=== 1550 ===
- 7 February. Julius III elected pope.
- June–September. Spain under Andrea Doria implement the Capture of Mahdia from the Ottomans.

1551

- 18 July. The Ottomans and Barbay pirates fail in their attempt to take Malta, but succeed in their Invasion of Gozo.
- Late July. The Portuguese overcome the Ottomans at the Siege of Qatif.
- 15 August. The Ottomans and Barbary pirates defeat the Knights of Malta and capture the Red Castle of Tripoli after a six-day Siege of Tripoli.
- 18 October. The Ottomans under Sokollu Mehmed Pasha begin an unsuccessful siege of the Hungarian Timișoara Fortress.

1552

- 9 July. In Hungary, Drégely Castle is attacked by the Ottoman Empire under Hadim Ali Pasha. Castle captain György Szondy and 140 soldiers die defending the castle against 8,000 Turks.
- 27 July. At the Siege of Temesvar, the Ottomans under Kara Ahmed Pasha capture the Timișoara Fortress.
- August. The Ottomans are successful in the Capture of Muscat from the Portuguese, beginning the Ottoman campaign against Hormuz.
- September. The Ottomans led by Kara Ahmed Pasha are unsuccessful in capturing Eger Castle in the Siege of Eger.

1553

- 6 October. Şehzade Mustafa is executed on the orders of his father Suleiman I.
- 24 August. The island is temporarily occupied by the Ottomans after a successful Invasion of Corsica.
- August. The Ottomans are forced to retreat at the Battle of the Strait of Hormuz.
- (Date unknown) Mahdia is abandoned by Spain and reoccupied by the Ottomans.

1554

- 7 January. Fez becomes and Ottoman vassal after the Capture of Fez.
- 25 July. Maximilian II of Austria elected as Holy Roman Emperor.
- 10–25 August. The Ottomans are defeated by the Portuguese at the Battle of the Gulf of Oman.

1555

- 23 May. Paul IV is elected pope. He succeeded Marcellus II who served for three weeks after the death of Julius III on 23 March.
- 29 May. The Peace of Amasya ends the Ottoman–Safavid War.

1559

- 10 July. Francis II of France becomes king after the accidental death of his father Henry II.
- November. The Portuguese defeat the Ottomans after the five-month Siege of Bahrain.
- 25 December. Pius IV elected pope.

=== 1560 ===
- 11 May. The Ottomans under admiral Piyale Pasha defeat a Christian fleet at the Battle of Djerba.
- 5 December. Charles IX of France becomes king upon the death of his brother Francis II.
- (Date unknown). A Portuguese fleet is defeated at the Battle of Kamaran by an Ottoman fleet under Sefer Reis.

1561

- 25 October. While under the protection of Tahmasp I, Ottoman prince Şehzade Bayezid is executed by orders of his father.

1565

- 18 May – 11 September. The Ottomans fail to take the island in the Great Siege of Malta.
- December. The Mariovo and Prilep rebellion in Rumelia is suppressed by the Ottomans.

1566

- 7 January. Pius V elected pope.
- April. Chios was captured from the Genoese after their surrender to Ottoman admiral Piyale Pasha.
- 6 September. Suleiman I dies at Turbék, en route to the fortress at Szigetvár.
- 8 September. The Ottomans capture the city and fortress in the Siege of Szigetvár, joining it to the Budin Eyalet.
- 7 September. Selim II becomes Ottoman sultan. His seven brothers had died at this point, either by natural causes or on the orders of their father.
- (Date unknown). Pius V expels prostitutes from Rome and the Papal States.

1568

- Early. Marcantonio Barbaro appointed Venetian bailo of Constantinople (ambassador to the Ottoman Empire).
- 21 February. Treaty of Adrianople concluded between Maximilian II and Selim II.
- 24 December. The second Rebellion of the Alpujarras begins.
- 27 September (estimated). The Great Fire of Constantinople devastates the city, as reported by Marcantonio Barbaro.

1569

- (Date unknown). The Capitulation of 1536 is renewed, exempting French merchants from Ottoman law and allowing them to travel, buy and sell throughout the sultanate and to pay low customs duties on French imports and exports.

=== 1570 ===
- 27 June. Ottomans set sail for Cyprus, beginning the Ottoman–Venetian War of 1570–1573.
- 1 July. Ottoman Cyprus established.
- 9 September. Piali Pasha besieges the city, resulting in the Massacre in Nicosia.
- 17 September. The Ottomans begin the Siege of Famagusta, the last Christian stronghold in Cyprus.

1571

- March. Suppression of the second Rebellion of the Alpujarras results in the expulsion of most Muslims from Spain.
- 24 May. Ottomans and Crimeans under Devlet I Giray raid the city of Moscow resulting in the Fire of Moscow.
- 25 May. The Holy League of 1571 formed to defeat the Ottomans.
- 5 August. Siege of Famagusta ends, bringing Cyprus completely under Ottoman control.
- 7 October. Spanish, Venetian, and Papal naval forces under Don John of Austria, defeat the Ottoman fleet of Müezzinzade Ali Pasha at the Battle of Lepanto.

1572

- 9 June. Henry III of Navarre becomes king and later, in 1589, becomes king of France (as Henry IV).

1573

- 7 March. The Ottoman–Venetian War is ended by a peace treaty, confirming the transfer of control of Cyprus from the Republic of Venice to the Ottoman Empire.

1574

- 30 May. Henry III of France becomes king upon the death of his brother Charles IX. He was also King of Poland and Grand Duke of Lithuania from 1573 to 1575. He was the last king of the Capetian house of Valois.
- 12 July – 13 September. The Ottomans are successful in their Conquest of Tunis.
- 15 December. Selim II dies.
- 27 December. Murad III accends to the Ottoman throne after strangling his four younger brother five days earlier.

1577

- 3 October. Ottoman forces led by Ferhad Pasha Sokolović begin the Siege of Gvozdansko against Croatia.

1578

- 13 January. The Croatian fort of Gvozdansko falls to the Ottomans.
- March. The Ottomans and Algerians place Abd al-Malik on the Moroccan throne with their Capture of Fez.
- 9 August. Lala Mustafa Pasha launches his Caucasian Campaign with the Battle of Çıldır. This is the beginning of the Ottoman–Safavid War of 1578–1590.

=== 1580 ===
- 9–11 May 1583. The Ottomans defeat the Safavids in the Battle of Torches.
- 24 April 1585. Sixtus V elected pope, with ambitions of the annihilation of the Turks, the conquest of Egypt, the transport of the Holy Sepulchre to Italy.
- 2 August 1589. Henry III of France is assassinated and succeeded by Henry IV of France, then king of Navarre. He was the first of the House of Bourbon.

=== 1590 ===
- 21 March. The Treaty of Constantinople ends the Ottoman–Safavid War.

1592

- 30 January. Clement VIII elected pope.
- 10–19 June. The Ottomans are successful in their Siege of Bihać.
- 11 September. Elizabeth I of England establishes diplomatic relations with the Ottoman Empire with the chartering of the Levant Company.

1593

- 22 June. Croatia defeats the Ottomans at the Battle of Sisak.
- 29 July. The Long Turkish War begins.

1594

- November. Clement VIII creates the Holy League of 1594 to counter the Turks.

1595

- 16 January. Mehmet III accession to throne.

1596

- 23–26 October. The Ottomans defeat a combined Habsburg-Transylvanian force at the Battle of Keresztes.

== 17th century ==
1603

- 26 September. The Ottoman–Safavid War begins, to last fifteen years.
- 22 December. Ahmed I becomes Ottoman sultan.

1648

- 8 August. Mehmed IV becomes Ottoman sultan.

1683

- 14 July – 12 September. Western forces defeat the Ottomans at the Battle of Vienna, the turning point for Ottoman expansion into Europe.

== Bibliography ==
- Agoston, Gabor; Masters, Bruce (2010). Encyclopedia of the Ottoman Empire. Facts On File, Inc. ISBN 9781438110257.
- Alderson, Anthony D. (1956). The Structure of the Ottoman Dynasty. Clarendon Press. ISBN 9780313225222.
- Allen, Bruce W. (2015). The Great Siege of Malta. University Press of New England. ISBN 9781611688436.
- Amitai-Preiss, Reuven (1995). Mongols and Mamluks: The Mamluk-Îlkhânid War, 1260–1281. Cambridge University Press. ISBN 9780521462266.
- Amitai-Preiss, Reuven (1999). The Mongol Empire and Its Legacy. Brill. ISBN 9789004110489.
- Asbridge, Thomas (2012). The Crusades: The War for the Holy Land. Simon & Schuster. ISBN 9781849836883.
- Atiya, Aziz Suryal (1934). The Crusade of Nicopolis. Methuen & Company, Limited. ISBN 9780404154103.
- Atiya, Aziz Suryal (1938). The Crusade in the Later Middle Ages. Methuen. ISBN 9780527037000.
- Atiya, Aziz Suryal (1975a). The Crusade in the Fourteenth Century (PDF). A History of the Crusades (Setton), Volume III.
- Atiya, Aziz Suryal (1975b). The Aftermath of the Crusades (PDF). A History of the Crusades (Setton), Volume III.
- Babinger, Franz (1978). Mehmed the Conqueror and his Time. Princeton University Press. ISBN 9780691010786.
- Barber, Malcolm (2006). The Trial of the Templars. Cambridge University Press. ISBN 9781107645769.
- Barker, John W. (1969). Manuel II Palaeologus (1391-1425): A Study in Late Byzantine Statesmanship. Rutgers University Press. ISBN 9780813505824.
- Barleti, Marin (2012). The Siege of Shkodra: Albanian's Courageous Stand Against Ottoman Conquest, 1478. Tirana Times. ISBN 9789995687779.
- Bartusis, Mark C. (1997). The Late Byzantine Army Arms and Society 1204-1453. University of Pennsylvania Press. ISBN 9780812216202.
- Beazley, Raymond (1923). Prince Henry the Navigator. New York, G. P. Putnam's sons.
- Bernardini, Michele (2016). Tīmūr and the Frankish Powers (PDF). In Norman Housley (ed.). The Crusade in the Fifteenth Century.
- Bishko, Charles Julian (1975). The Spanish and Portuguese Reconquest, 1095-1492 (PDF). A History of the Crusades (Setton), Volume III.
- Bosworth, Clifford Edmund (2004). The New Islamic dynasties: A Chronological and Genealogical Manual. Edinburgh University Press. ISBN 9780748621378.
- Brackob, A.K. (2020). Mircea the Old: Father of Wallachia, Grandfather of Dracula. Histria Books. ISBN 9781592110735.
- Brockman, Eric (1969). The Two Sieges of Rhodes, 1480–1522. J. Murray. ISBN 9780719518942.
- Brummett, Palmira (1993). Ottoman Seapower and Levantine Diplomacy in the Age of Discovery. State University of New York Press. ISBN 9780791497838.
- Bryce, James (1892). The Holy Roman Empire. London, Macmillan and co.
- Burton, Keith Augustus (2007). The Blessing of Africa: The Bible and African Christianity. InterVarsity Press. ISBN 9780830827626.
- Buttigieg, Emanuel; Phillips, Simon (2016). Islands and Military Orders, c.1291-c.1798. Routledge. ISBN 9781317111962.
- Cahen, Claude (1968). Pre-Ottoman Turkey. University of Michigan. ISBN 9781597400275.ƒ1307
- Cahen, Claude (1969). The Mongols and the Near East (PDF). A History of the Crusades (Setton), Volume II.
- Çelik, Siren (2021). Manuel II Palaiologos (1350–1425): A Byzantine Emperor in a Time of Tumult. Cambridge University Press. ISBN 9781108874038.
- Chasin, Martin (1989). The Crusade of Varna (PDF). A History of the Crusades (Setton), Volume VI.
- Chaytor, Henry John (1933). A History of Aragon and Catalonia. Methuen. ISBN 9780404014797.
- Clot, André (2012). Suleiman the Magnificent. Saqi Books. ISBN 9780863568039.
- Cox, Eugene L. (1967). The Green Count of Savoy, Amadeus VI and Transalpine Savoy in the Fourteenth Century. Princeton University Press. ISBN 9780691051253.
- Creasy, Edward Shepherd (1878). History of the Ottoman Turks from the Beginning of their Empire to the Present Time. New York, H. Holt.
- Christiansen, Eric (1997). The Northern Crusades. Penguin Publishing Group. ISBN 9780140266535.
- Danvers, Frederick Charles (1894). The Portuguese in India: A.D. 1481–1571. W.H. Allen & Company, limited.
- Davies, Brian L. (2007). Warfare, State and Society on the Black Sea Steppe, 1500–1700. Routledge. ISBN 9780415239851.
- Delaville Le Roulx, Joseph (1904). Les Hospitaliers en Terre Sainte et à Chypre (1100–1310). E. Leroux, Paris.
- Demurger, Alain (2009). The Last Templar: The Tragedy of Jacques de Molay. Profile Books. ISBN 9781846682247.
- Diffie, Bailey Wallys (1977). Foundations of the Portuguese Empire, 1415–1580. University of Minnesota Press. ISBN 9780816608508.
- Disney, A. R. (2009). A History of Portugal and the Portuguese Empire. Cambridge University Press. ISBN 9780511813337.
- Drees, Clayton (2000). The Late Medieval Age of Crisis and Renewal, 1300–1500: A Biographical Dictionary. Bloomsbury. ISBN 9781567507492.
- Duffy, Eamon (2006). Saints & Sinners: A History of the Popes. Yale University Press. ISBN 9780300115970.
- Dunbabin, Jean (1998). Charles I of Anjou: Power, Kingship and State-Making in Thirteenth-Century Europe. Longman. ISBN 9781780937670.
- Dyer, Thomas Henry (1861). The History of Modern Europe, from the Fall of Constantinople, in 1453, to the War in Crimea, in 1857. London, J. Murray.
- Edbury, Peter W. (1991). The Kingdom of Cyprus and the Crusades, 1191–1374. Cambridge University Press. ISBN 9780521268769.
- Fine, John V. A. (1994). The Late Medieval Balkans: A Critical Survey from the Late Twelfth Century to the Ottoman Conquest. University of Michigan Press. ISBN 9780472082605.
- Finkel, Caroline (1988). The Administration of Warfare: The Ottoman Military Campaigns in Hungary, 1593–1606. VWGÖ. ISBN 3853697089.
- Finkel, Caroline (2006). Osman's Dream: The Story of the Ottoman Empire 1300–1923. Basic Books. ISBN 9780465023967.
- Florescu, Radu (2009). Dracula, Prince of Many Faces: His Life and Times. Little, Brown. ISBN 9780316092265.
- Frale, Barbara (2011). The Templars: The Secret History Revealed. Arcade. ISBN 9781611450194.
- France, John (2006). The Crusades and the Expansion of Catholic Christendom, 1000-1714. Routledge. ISBN 9781134196180.
- Freely, John (2009). The Grand Turk: Sultan Mehmet II–Conqueror of Constantinople and Master of an Empire. Overlook. ISBN 9781590204498.
- Frost, Robert (2015). The Oxford History of Poland-Lithuania. Oxford University Press. ISBN 9780191746345.
- Geanakoplos, Deno John (1975). Byzantium and the Crusades, 1354–1453 (PDF). A History of the Crusades (Setton), Volume III.
- Georgiou, Constantinos (2018). Preaching the Crusades to the Eastern Mediterranean: Propaganda, Liturgy and Diplomacy. Routledge. ISBN 9780367592523.
- Géza, Perjés (1989). The Fall of the Medieval Kingdom of Hungary. Social Science Monographs. ISBN 9780880351522.
- Ghazarian, Jacob G. (2000). The Armenian Kingdom in Cilicia During the Crusades. Curzon. ISBN 9780700714186.
- Gibbon, Edward (1870). The Crusades. London: A. Murray and Son.
- Gifford, John (1792). The History of France. London, Printed for C. Lowndes and W. Locke.
- Goldstein, Ivo (1999). Croatia: A History. Hurst. ISBN 9781850655251.
- Grousset, René (1934). Histoire des Croisades et du Royaume Franc de Jérusalem. Plon, Paris.
- Grousset, René (1935). L'Épopée des Croisades. Le Club français du livre. Histoire,38. Paris: le Club français du livre.
- Grousset, René (1970). The Empire of the Steppes: A History of Central Asia. Translated by Naomi Walford. Rutgers University Press. ISBN 9780813513041.
- Har-El, Shai (1995). Struggle for Domination in the Middle East: The Ottoman-Mamluk War, 1485–1491. E. J. Brill. ISBN 9789004101807.
- Harvey, Leonard Patrick (1992). Islamic Spain, 1250 to 1500. University of Chicago Press. ISBN 9780226319629.
- Harvey, Leonard Patrick (2005). Muslims in Spain, 1500–1614. University of Chicago Press. ISBN 9780226319636.
- Hazard, Harry W. (1975). Moslem North Africa, 1049–1394 (PDF). A History of the Crusades (Setton), Volume III.
- Hazlitt, William Carew (1900). The Venetian Republic. A. and C. Black, London.
- Heymann, Frederick Gotthold (1975). The Crusades against the Hussites (PDF). A History of the Crusades (Setton), Volume III.
- Hillgarth, J. N. (1978). The Spanish Kingdoms, 1250–1516. Clarendon Press. ISBN 9780198225317.
- Hodgkinson, Henry (1999). Scanderbeg: From Ottoman Captive to Albanian Hero. Learning Design. ISBN 9781903616154.
- Housley, Norman (1982). The Italian Crusades: The Papal-Angevin Alliance and the Crusades against Christian Lay Powers, 1254–1343. Clarendon Press. ISBN 9780198219255.
- Housley, Norman (1986). The Avignon Papacy and the Crusades, 1305-1378. Clarendon Press. ISBN 9780198219576.
- Housley, Norman (1992). The Later Crusades, 1274-1580: From Lyons to Alcazar. Oxford University Press. ISBN 9780198221371.
- Housley, Norman (2004). Housley, Norman (ed.). Crusading in the Fifteenth Century: Message and Impact. Springer Link. doi:10.1057/9780230523357. ISBN 9781403902832.
- Housley, Norman (2016). The Crusade in the Fifteenth Century: Converging and Competing Cultures. Taylor & Francis Group. ISBN 9781315615158.
- Housley, Norman (2017). Reconfiguring the Fifteenth-Century Crusade. Palgrave Macmillian UK. ISBN 9781137462817.
- Howarth, Stephen (1982). Knights Templar. Marboro Books, New York. ISBN 9780002164528.
- Huizinga, Johan (1924). The Waning of the Middle Ages. London: Edward Arnold & Co.
- Imber, Colin (1990). The Ottoman Empire, 1300–1481. Isis Press. ISBN 9789754280159.
- Imber, Colin (2002). The Ottoman Empire,1300–1650: The Structure of Power. Palgrave Macmillan. ISBN 9780333613863.
- İnalcık, Halil (1989a). The Ottoman Turks and the Crusades, 1329–1451 (PDF). A History of the Crusades (Setton), Volume VI.
- İnalcık, Halil (1989b). The Ottoman Turks and the Crusades, 1451–1522 (PDF). A History of the Crusades (Setton), Volume VI.
- Irwin, Robert (1986). The Middle East in the Middle Ages: The Early Mamluk Sultanate, 1250–1382. Southern Illinois University Press. ISBN 9781597400480.
- Jackson, Peter (2005). The Mongols and the West: 1221–1410. Pearson Longman. ISBN 9780582368965.
- Jefferson, John (2012). The Holy Wars of King Wladislas and Sultan Murad: The Ottoman-Christian Conflict from 1438–1444. Brill. ISBN 9789004219045.
- Johnson, Edgar N. (1975). The German Crusade on the Baltic (PDF). A History of the Crusades (Setton), Volume III.
- Jučas, Mečislovas (2009). The Battle of Grünwald. National Museum. ISBN 9786099507453.
- Kiaupa, Zigmantas (2000). The History of Lithuania before 1795. Lithuanian Institute of History. ISBN 9789986810131.
- Kastritsis, Dimitris (2007). The Sons of Bayezid. Brill. ISBN 9789047422471.
- Kazhdan, Alexander P. (2005). Oxford Dictionary of Byzantium. Oxford University Press. ISBN 9780195046526.
- Kurkjian, Vahan M. (1958). History of Armenia. Armenian General Benevolent Union of America.
- Laiou, Angeliki E. (2002), "Political History: An Outline", in Laiou, Angeliki E. (ed.), The Economic History of Byzantium: From the Seventh through the Fifteenth Century, Dumbarton Oaks, ISBN 9780884023326
- Lane-Poole, Stanley (1901). History of Egypt in the Middle Ages. A History of Egypt; v. 6. Methuen, London. ISBN 9780790532042.
- Lardner, Dionysius (1833). History of Spain and Portugal. Philadelphia: Carey & Lea.
- Leopold, Antony R. (2000). How to Recover the Holy Land: The Crusade Proposals of the Late Thirteenth and Early Fourteenth Centuries. Ashgate. ISBN 9780754601203.
- Lesaffer, Randall (2004). Peace Treaties and International Law in European History: From the Late Middle Ages to World War One. Cambridge University Press. ISBN 9781139453783.
- Lock, Peter (1995). The Franks in the Aegean 1204-1500. Routledge. ISBN 9780582051393.
- Lock, Peter (2006). The Routledge Companion to the Crusades. Routledge. doi:10.4324/9780203389638. ISBN 9780415393126.
- Luke, Harry (1921). Cyprus Under the Turks, 1571–1878. Oxford University Press.
- Luke, Harry (1975). The Kingdom of Cyprus, 1369–1489 (PDF). A History of the Crusades (Setton), Volume III.
- Luttrell, Anthony T. (1975). The Hospitallers at Rhodes, 1306–1421 (PDF). A History of the Crusades (Setton), Volume III.
- Luttrell, Anthony T. (1982). Latin Greece, the Hospitallers, and the Crusades, 1291-1440. University of Michigan. ISBN 9780860781066.
- Lützow, Francis (1914). The Hussite Wars. London, J. M. Dent & sons.
- Mallett, Michael E. (2014). The Italian Wars, 1494–1559. Taylor & Francis. ISBN 9781317899396.
- Merriman, R. B. (2008). Suleiman the Magnificent, 1520–1566. Read Books. ISBN 9781443731454.
- Michaud, Joseph–François (1881). The History of the Crusades. Translated by William Robson. Published by George Routledge and Sons.
- Miller, William (1908). The Latins in the Levant: A History of Frankish Greece 1204-1566. New York: Dutton.
- Miller, William (1921). Essays on the Latin Orient. Cambridge University Press.
- Mixson, James (2022). The Crusade of 1456. University of Toronto Press. ISBN 9781487505769.
- Moore, Clement Clarke (1850). George Castriot, surnamed Scanderbeg, King of Albania. New York, D. Appleton & company.
- Muir, William (1896). The Mameluke, or, Slave Dynasty of Egypt. London, Smith, Elder.
- Murray, Alan V. (2001). Crusade and Conversion on the Baltic Frontier 1150–1500. Ashgate. ISBN 9780754603252.
- Murray, Alan V. (2006). The Crusades—An Encyclopedia. ABC-CLIO. ISBN 9781576078624.
- Murray, Alan V. (2009). The Clash of Cultures on the Medieval Baltic Frontier. Ashgate. ISBN 9780754664833.
- Mutafian, Claude; Otten-Froux, Catherine (1993). Le Royaume Arménien de Cilicie. University of Michigan. ISBN 9782271051059.
- Natho, Kadir I. (2009). Circassian History. ISBN 9781465316998.
- Nervo, Jean Baptiste (1897). Isabella the Catholic, Queen of Spain: Her Life, Reign, and Times, 1451–1504. London, Smith, Elder, & Co.
- Nicol, Donald M. (1993). The Last Centuries of Byzantium, 1261–1453. Cambridge University Press. ISBN 9780521439916.
- Nicolle, David (1983). Armies of the Ottoman Turks, 1300–1774. Bloomsbury USA. ISBN 9780850455113.
- Nicolle, David (1995). The Janissaries. Bloomsbury USA. ISBN 9781855324138.
- Nicolle, David (2005a). Acre 1291: Bloody Sunset of the Crusader States. Bloomsbury USA. ISBN 9781841768625.
- Nicolle, David (2005b). Constantinople 1453, The End of Byzantium. Praeger. ISBN 9780275988562.
- Noli, Fan Stylian (1947). George Castrioti Scanderber (1405–1468). International Universities Press.
- O'Callaghan, Joseph F. (2011). The Gibraltar Crusade: Castile and the Battle for the Strait. University of Pennsylvania Press. ISBN 9780812204636.
- O'Callaghan, Joseph F. (2014). The Last Crusade in the West: Castile and the Conquest of Granada. University of Pennsylvania Press. ISBN 9780812209358.
- Ostrogorsky, George (1969). History of the Byzantine State. ISBN 9780813505992.
- Ozgen, Korkut (2002). Chronology of the Ottomans. The Ottomans.
- Petry, Carl F. (1993). Twilight of Majesty: The Reigns of the Mamlūk Sultans Al-Ashrāf Qāytbāy and Qanṣūh Al-Ghawrī in Egypt. University of Washington Press. ISBN 9780295973074.
- Peirce, Leslie P. (1993). The Imperial Harem: Women and Sovereignty in the Ottoman Empire. Oxford University Press. ISBN 9780195086775.
- Pilat, Liviu (2017). The Ottoman Threat and Crusading on the Eastern Border of Christendom During the 15th Century. Brill. ISBN 9789004353800.
- Plum, Harry Grant (1906). The Teutonic Order and its Secularization. University of Iowa City.
- Prescott, William H. (1844). History of the Reign of Ferdinand and Isabella, the Catholic. Boston: C. C. Little and J. Brown.
- Prpic, George J. (1972). Croatia and Hungary During the Turkish Era. Center for Southern-Hungarian and Balkan Studies.
- Riley-Smith, Jonathan (2001). The Oxford Illustrated History of The Crusades. Oxford University Press. ISBN 9780192854285.
- Robertson, William (1875). The History of the Reign of Charles the Fifth. J.B. Lippincott & Co.
- Rossi, Ettore (1975). The Hospitallers at Rhodes, 1421–1523 (PDF). A History of the Crusades (Setton), Volume III.
- Roux, Jean-Paul (1993). Histoire de l'Empire Mongol. Fayard. ISBN 9782213031644.
- Runciman, Steven (1954). A History of the Crusades, Volume 3: The Kingdom of Acre and the Later Crusades. Cambridge University Press. ISBN 9780521347723.
- Runciman, Steven (1965). The Fall of Constantinople 1453. Cambridge University Press. ISBN 9780521398329.
- Russell, Peter E. (2000). Prince Henry the Navigator: A Life. Yale University Press. ISBN 9780300082333.
- Sayer, Frederick (1865). The history of Gibraltar and of its political relation to events in Europe. London, Chapman and Hall.
- Setton, Kenneth M. (1969). A History of the Crusades. University of Wisconsin Press.
- Setton, Kenneth M. (1975). The Catalans and Florentines in Greece, 1380–1462 (PDF). A History of the Crusades (Setton), Volume III.
- Setton, Kenneth M. (1976a). The Papacy and the Levant, 1204–1571, Volume II: The Fifteenth Century. American Philosophical Society. ISBN 9780871691149.
- Setton, Kenneth M. (1976b). The Papacy and the Levant, 1204–1571, Volume III: The Sixteenth Century to the Reign of Julius III. American Philosophical Society. ISBN 9780871691149.
- Setton, Kenneth M. (1976c). The Papacy and the Levant, 1204–1571, Volume IV: The Sixteenth Century from Julius III to Pius V. American Philosophical Society. ISBN 9780871691149.
- Setton, Kenneth M. (1989). The Ottoman Turks and the Crusades 1451-1522 (PDF). A History of the Crusades (Setton), Volume VI.
- Setton, Kenneth M. (1991). Venice, Austria, and the Turks in the Seventeenth Century. American Philosophical Society. ISBN 9780871691927.
- Shirogorov, Vladimir (2021). War on the Eve of Nations: Conflicts and Militaries in Eastern Europe, 1450–1500. Lexington Books. ISBN 9781793622419.
- Sinor, Denis (1975). The Mongols and Western Europe (PDF). A History of the Crusades (Setton), Volume III.
- Stephens, Frederic G. (1870). A History of Gibraltar and its sieges. Provost.
- Sterns, Indrikis (1985). The Teutonic Knights in the Crusader States (PDF). A History of the Crusades (Setton), Volume V.
- Stewart, Angus Donal (2001). The Armenian Kingdom and the Mamluks. Brill. ISBN 9789004122925.
- Stone, Daniel (2001). The Polish-Lithuanian State 1386-1795. University of Washington Press. ISBN 9780295980935.
- Sugar, Peter F. (1977). Southeastern Europe Under Ottoman Rule, 1354–1804. University of Washington Press. ISBN 9780295960333.
- Taaffe, John (1852). The History of the Holy, Military, Sovereign Order of St. John of Jerusalem. Oxford University. ISBN 9780353547513.
- Topping, Peter (1975). The Morea, 1364–1460 (PDF). A History of the Crusades (Setton), Volume III.
- Townsend, George Henry (1867). A Manual of Dates. London, Warne.
- Treptow, Kurt (1991). Dracula: Essays on the Life and Times of Vlad Țepeș. Eastern European Monographs. ISBN 9780880332200.
- Turnbull, Stephen (2003). The Ottoman Empire, 1326–1699. Routledge. ISBN 9780415969130.
- Turnbull, Stephen (2005). Tannenberg, 1410: Disaster for the Teutonic Knights. Praeger. ISBN 9780275988609.
- Urban, William L. (1975). The Baltic Crusade. Northern Illinois University Press. ISBN 9780875800523.
- Urban, William L. (1999). Tannenberg and After: Lithuania, Poland, and the Teutonic Order in Search of Immortality. Lithuanian Research and Studies Center. ISBN 9780929700250.
- Urban, William L. (2003). The Teutonic Knights. Greenhill. ISBN 9781853675355.
- Urban, William L. (2006). The Samogitian Crusade. Lithuanian Research and Studies Center. ISBN 9780929700038.
- Vasiliev, Alexander (1936). The Goths in the Crimea. Mediaeval Academy of America. ISBN 9780910956093.
- Venning, Timothy (2015). A Chronology of the Crusades. Taylor & Francis. ISBN 9781317496434.
- Villari, Pasquale (1910). Mediaeval Italy from Charlemagne to Henry VII. London: T. Fisher Unwin.
- Waterson, James (2007). The Knights of Islam: The Wars of the Mamluks. London: Greenhill Books. ISBN 9781853677342.
- Woodhouse, F. C. (1879). Teutonic Knights. In The Military Religious Orders of the Middle Ages.
- Wyatt, Walter James (1876). The History of Prussia from the Earliest Yimes to the Present Day. London, Longmans, Green and Co.
- Ziyādaẗ, Muḥammad Muṣṭafā (1975). The Mamluk Sultans, 1291–1517 (PDF). A History of the Crusades (Setton), Volume III.
