= Aṣalbāy =

Mother of Mamluk Sultan
- Tenure: 7 August 1496 – 31 October 1498
- Born: Circassia
- Died: c. 1509; Mecca,Mamluk Sultanate
- Spouse: Qaitbay Al-Ashraf Janbalat (m. 1500; died 1501)
- Issue: With Qaitbay; An-Nasir Muhammad ibn Qaitbay

Khawand Aṣalbāy al-Jarkasiyya (died 1509) was a Mamluk consort. She was the concubine of sultan Sayf ad-Din Qa'itbay (r. 1468–1496), mother of sultan An-Nasir Muhammad ibn Qaitbay (r. 1496–1498), sister of sultan Abu Sa'id Qansuh (r. 1498–1500), and wife of sultan Al-Ashraf Janbalat (r. 1500–1501).

== Life ==
Aṣalbāy was a Circassian and fell victim to the Black Sea slave trade, as did her brother. She was either directly purchased, or purchased and given as gift, to the sultan Sayf ad-Din Qa'itbay; it is believed that the sultan bought her directly. She was placed in the Burji harem and used as a concubine. She apparently became the favorite concubine of the sultan, and the mother of An-Nasir Muhammad ibn Qaitbay in 1482. When it was discovered that her brother was also in the possession of the sultan, he was promoted and able to make a successful career, and he was appointed dawadar, the protector of the Sultan's heir and the future Sultan, Muhammad. Since the sultan acknowledged paternity of her son as his, she became manumitted as an Umm walad after the death of Qa'itbay.

The Mamluk Sultanate was not in fact an actual monarchy passed from father to son. However, after the death of Qaitbay in 1496, she supported her son's ambitions to conquer the throne. In cooperation with her brother, she successfully supported her son when he defeated the powerful Grand Dawādār Aqbardī and conquered power, and participated in supporting her son by using her contacts to create alliances.

When a conflict occurred between her son and her brother in February 1498, she called both to the Cairo Citadel and asked them to given an oath not to fight against each other. In September 1498 she herself came in to conflict with her son when she opposed his wish to marry Miṣirbāy (d. 1522), the Circassian former slave of Kurtbāy, Governor of Gaza. She was however not able to resolve the dispute. Her son was deposed in 1498 and succeeded by her brother sultan Abu Sa'id Qansuh (r. 1498–1500).

In 1500, she married sultan Al-Ashraf Janbalat (r. 1500–1501), who succeeded her brother on the throne the same year. Her wealth was displayed when her dowry was transported in procession through Cairo from her residence to that of her new husband during the wedding.

Her spouse was deposed in 1501, and she left the harem of the Cairo Citadel for a private residence in the city of Cairo. She was temporarily arrested by the new sultan, who wished to acquire her property. In 1508, she performed a pilgrimage to Mecca; this pilgrimage has been referred to as in reality an exile. She remained in Mecca for the rest of her life, since sultan Qānsūh al-Ghawrī (r. 1501–1516) refused to give her permission to return to Egypt.

She is known as one of only three female patrons of mosques and minbars during the Mamluk era.
