= Abu Sa'id Qansuh =

Sultan of Egypt and Syria
- Reign: 31 October 1498 – 30 June 1500
- Predecessor: Al-Malik an-Nasir Muhammad
- Successor: Abu al-Nasir Janbalat
- Born: 1473
- Died: After 1500
- Spouse: Khawand Misirbay

Abu Sa'id Qansuh, also Qansuh Al-Ashrafi, Qansuh I or Al-Zahir Qansuh (Arabic: الظاهر قانصوه الأشرفي) was the twenty third Mamluk Sultan of Egypt from the Burji dynasty. He ruled the Mamluk Sultanate between 1498 and 1500.

== Biography ==
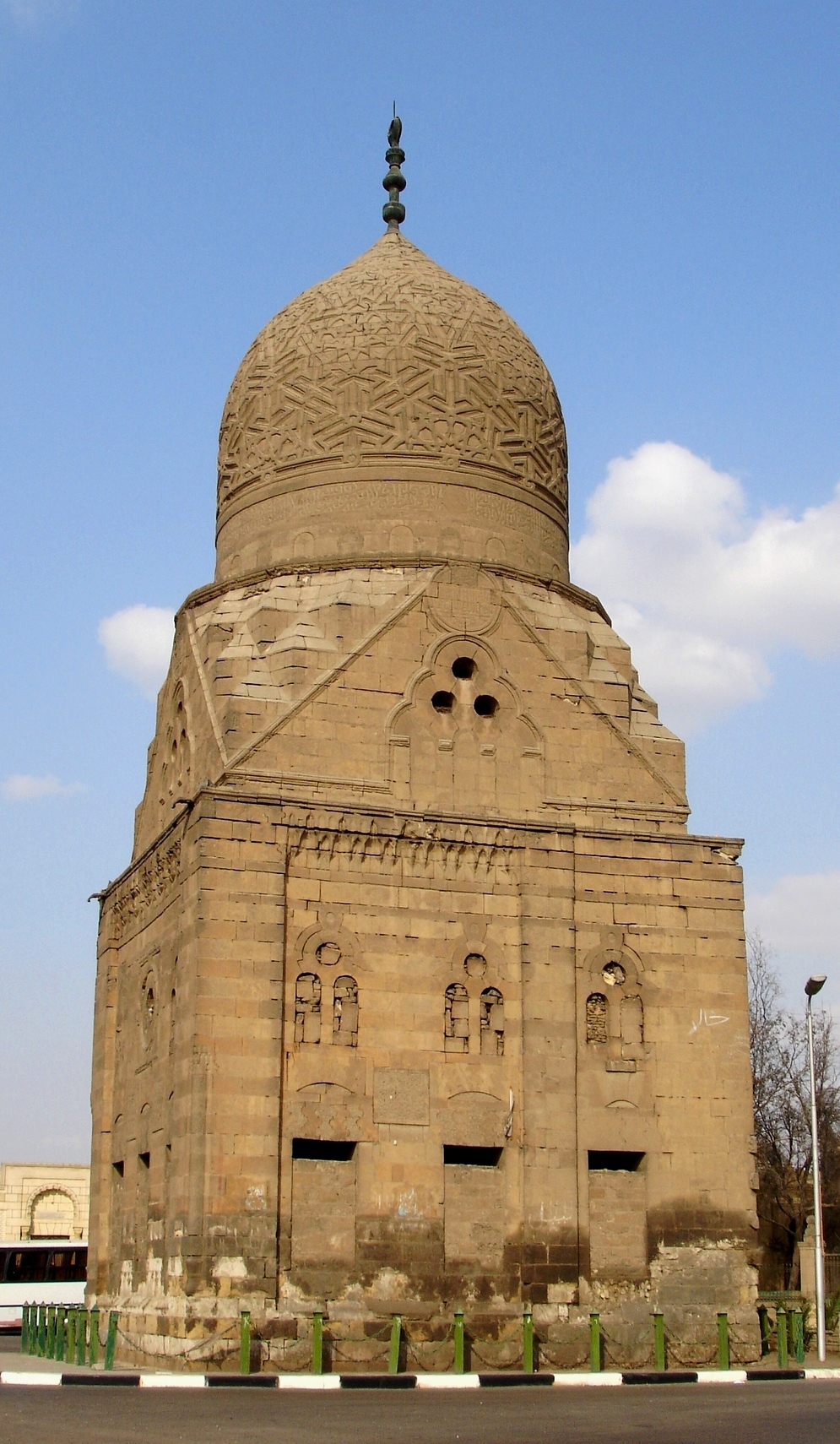
Tomb of Sultan Abu Sa'id Qansuh

Abu Sa'id Qansuh was originally a young Circassian victim of the Black Sea slave trade purchased by Sultan Qaytbay. When Sultan Qaytbay discovered that he was the brother of his favorite slave concubine Aṣalbāy he was appointed dawadar, the protector of the Sultan's heir and the future Sultan, Muhammad.

When Muhammad took over, the Mamluks grew discontent with the Sultan, rebelled, killed him, and elected Abu Sa'id Qansuh in his place. Facing another similar path as Sultan, the Mamluks became discontent with Qansuh. Qansuh tried to flee the palace disguised as a woman, but was caught and exiled to Alexandria.

Qansuh was supposedly strangled to death by the orders of the future Sultan Tuman bay I. However, he was overthrown and succeeded by Abu al-Nasir Janbalat.

He married Miṣirbāy (d. 1522), the widow of his predecessor; she eventually married Khā’ir Bek, the first Ottoman Governor of Egypt.

== Sources ==
Regnal titles
Preceded by Muhammad	Mamluk Sultan of Egypt; 1498-1500	Succeeded by Janbalat
