= Iman al-Ghuri =

Syrian actress (1968–2025)

- إيمان الغوري
- Born: 3 October 1968; Riyadh, Saudi Arabia
- Died: 18 August 2025 (aged 56); Aleppo, Syria
- Education: Gerasimov Institute of Cinematography
- Occupations: Actress, artist
- Years active: 1993–2025

Iman al-Ghuri (Arabic: إيمان الغوري, romanized: Īmān al-Ghūrī; 3 October 1968 – 18 August 2025) was a Syrian actress.

== Life and career ==
Iman al-Ghuri was born in Riyadh, Saudi Arabia, and her roots go back to the ancient migrations of the Circassians, and her lineage goes back to Al-Ashraf Qansuh al-Ghuri.

Al-Ghuri participated in six theatrical productions before studying acting. Her debut was through a play written by Farhan Bulbul entitled "Don't Be Afraid of the Sword's Edge" when she was fourteen years old. After completing her secondary education, she considered enrolling in the Higher Institute of Dramatic Arts in Damascus, but was unable to do so. However, she won a Syrian government scholarship to Moscow, Russia, to study acting at the Russian State Cinema Institute. In 1993, she obtained a diploma in acting from the State Cinema Institute in Moscow. After her return, she joined the Artists Syndicate in Aleppo and participated in television and radio productions. She became famous through the character of Khairo in the series "Ahlam Abu Al-Hana. "

She completely abandoned acting in 2002 after participating in the series The Roots Remain Green and devoted herself to her family life after giving birth to her only son, Ward. Newspapers published news of her participation in the series Rozanna, but she apologized for not being satisfied with the role.

Al-Ghuri died in Aleppo on 18 August 2025, at the age of 58.

== Filmography ==
=== Television ===
Year of Production	Series Name	Character
2002	The Roots Remain Green	Umm Ghassan
2001	What We Talked About	Umm Qusay
1998	Daoud's Riddles in Hollywood	
1998	Family Diaries	Guest Star
1998	Green Hearts	
1997	The Halabi Wedding and Tales from the Journey of Barlek	
1997	Bab Al-Hadid	
1997	Jamil and Hanaa's Diaries	Maha the Second
1996	Ahlam Abu Al-Hana's Dreams	Khairou – Umm Al-Khair
1998	Khan Al-Hariri Part 2	Sobhiya
1996	Khan Al-Hariri Part 1	Sobhiya
1996	Tal Al-Loz	
1996	Abu Antar's Diaries	
1996	Our Cousins' House Is No Stranger	
1994	Mercy Council TV evening	
1994	The Lover TV evening	

=== Film ===
Year of Production	Movie	Character
1997	Strangers' Dust	

=== Theater ===
Year of Production	Play	Character
2014	Halabi, Biduna, and Amber	
1997	Night Monster	Hassa
	A Day of Our Time	
	Al-Shater Hassan	
	Abu Al-Fawaris	
	Don't Pay the Bill	
