= Dawatdar =

Office in medieval Islamic states

Depiction of the Siege of Baghdad (1258) in Rashid al-Din's Jami al-tawarikh; the soldiers on the pontoons block the dawatdar from escaping down the Tigris.

Dawatdar (Persian: دواتدار) or Dawadar (Arabic: دوادار), also Duwaydar and Amir Dawat, was a senior court office in medieval Islamic states. Meaning 'the keeper of the inkpot', it was created during the Seljuk Empire. It denoted the head of the chancery, and derived its name from the royal inkpot, symbol of office of the viziers of the Abbasid caliphs.

Under the Mamluk Sultanate it was initially a lowly office, but during the Burji dynasty it became one of the seven most important offices, being termed 'Grand Keeper of the Inkpot' (dawadar kabir), and receiving additional, junior dawadars as aides. The office variously had responsibilities over tax and harvest collection in Upper Egypt, or the mustering of soldiers for campaigns; some holders of the office accumulated great power, and some even rose to become sultans themselves.

In the Ottoman Empire and Safavid Empire, the dawatdars were mere chancery scribes.

== Sources ==
- Ayalon, D. (1965). "Dawādār". In Lewis, B.; Pellat, Ch. & Schacht, J. (eds.). The Encyclopaedia of Islam, Second Edition. Volume II: C–G. Leiden: E. J. Brill. p. 172. doi:10.1163/1573-3912_islam_SIM_1740. OCLC 495469475.
