= Portuguese expedition to Otranto =

Portuguese Expedition to Otranto
- Part of the Crusades
Date	1481
Location	Otranto, southern Italy 40°9′N 18°29′E
Result	Inconclusive
Territorial changes	Otranto liberated without Portuguese involvement

Belligerents
Kingdom of Portugal	Ottoman Empire

Commanders and leaders
Garcia de Meneses, Bishop of Évora	Gedik Ahmed Pasha

The Portuguese expedition to Otranto in 1481, which the Portuguese call the Turkish Crusade (Portuguese: Cruzada Turca), arrived too late to participate in any fighting. On 8 April 1481, Pope Sixtus IV issued the papal bull Cogimur iubente altissimo, which called for a crusade against the Ottomans, who had occupied Otranto, in southern Italy. The Pope's intention was that after recapturing Otranto, the crusaders would cross the Adriatic and liberate Vlorë (Valona) as well.

Portugal decided to send a squadron into Otranto under command of the bishop of Évora, Garcia de Meneses. In a letter dated 27 August 1481 to Cardinal Paolo di Campofregoso, Sixtus wrote, "From Portugal there are twenty caravels and a cargo ship that we expect on the day at St Paul's, whose leader is a venerable brother Garcia, bishop of Évora". On 7 September, Sixtus wrote to King Ferdinand I of Naples, le to inform him that "a fleet which we sent for proceeds to Otranto from Portugal.... We hope it will be of great use in the assault on Otranto...". On 14 September, the very day that the Ottomans surrendered Otranto, the Pope was writing from Bracciano to his vice-chamberlain, who had informed him of the slow progress of the Portuguese fleet. Sixtus was suspicious of Garcia's intentions. The next day, he wrote to the bishop and praised him for his diligence and caution but urged him to take his fleet to Vlorë to oust the Ottoman garrison there to do "something worthy of the Christian religion and your honor and that of your king" in reference to the recently deceased king Afonso V. Sixtus also urged Garcia to take Andreas Palaiologos, the deposed despot of Morea, back to Greece to begin the reconquest of his lands.

When the Portuguese reached Naples, the Ottomans had already withdrawn, because on May 3, Ottoman Sultan Mehmed II had died, and quarrels about his succession then ensued.
