= Al-Ashraf Janbalat =

Sultan of Egypt and Syria from 1500 to 1501

Sultan of Egypt and Syria
- Reign: 30 June 1500 – 25 January 1501
- Predecessor: Abu Sa'id Qansuh
- Successor: Sayf ad-Din Tumanbay
- Born: 1455
- Died: 1501 (aged 45–46)
- Spouse: Khawand Aslbay

Al-Ashraf Abu al-Nasir Janbalat (Arabic: الأشرف أبو النصر جانبلاط; 1455 – 1501) was a Mamluk sultan of Egypt from 30 June 1500 to 25 January 1501.

== Biography ==
Abu al-Nasir Janbalat, who was about 45 years old, raised to the throne after Sultan Qansuh, threatened by a plot, fled in 1500. The chancellor Tuman-bay, who had ruled Syria, overthrew him in 1501. Janbalat tried to resist in the citadel, but was defeated, captured, and sent into exile in Alexandria, to be later executed in 1501.

== Sources ==
- Nicole, David (2014). Mamluk 'Askari 1250–1517. Bloomsbury Publishing. ISBN 1782009302.

Regnal titles
Preceded by Abu Sa'id Qansuh	Mamluk Sultan of Egypt; 30 June 1500–25 January 1501	Succeeded by Sayf ad-Din Tumanbay
