= An-Nasir Muhammad ibn Qaitbay =

Sultan of Egypt and Syria
- Reign: 7 August 1496 – 31 October 1498
- Predecessor: Qaitbay
- Successor: Abu Sa'id Qansuh
- Born: 1482
- Died: 31 October 1498 (aged 15–16)
- Spouse: Gevhermelik Hatun; Khawand Misirbay
- Father: Qaitbay
- Mother: Khawand Aṣalbāy

An-Nasir Muhammad ibn Qaitbay (Arabic: الناصر ناصر الدين محمد بن قايتباي; 1482 – 31 October 1498) was the son of Qaitbay, and a Mamluk sultan of Egypt from 7 August 1496 to 31 October 1498, when he was assassinated.

His first wife was Gevhermelik Hatun, daughter of Cem Sultan and granddaughter of Ottoman Sultan Mehmed II the Conqueror.

He married Miṣirbāy (d. 1522), former Circassian slave concubine and then widow of Kurtbāy, Governor of Gaza; she later married his successor sultan Abu Sa'id Qansuh (r. 1498-1500), and finally in 1517 to Khā’ir Bek, the first Ottoman Governor of Egypt.

Regnal titles
Preceded by Qaitbay	Mamluk Sultan of Egypt; 7 August 1496–31 October 1498	Succeeded by Abu Sa'id Qansuh
