= Burji Mamluks =

Dynasty of Egyptian monarchs (1382–1517 CE)

State of the Circassians دولة الجراكسة (Arabic) Dawlat al-Jarākisa
- 1382–1517
- Status: Sultanate with ceremonial caliph
- Capital: Cairo
- Spoken languages: Arabic; Kipchak Turkish; Circassian
- Religion: Sunni Islam
- Sultan
  - 1382-89 · 1390-1399: Barquq
  - 1508-1516 · 1517: Al-Mutawakkil III
- History
  - Established: 1382
  - Disestablished: 1517
Preceded by	Succeeded by
Bahri Mamluks	Ottoman Empire

The Burji Mamluks (Arabic: المماليك البرجية, romanized: al-Mamalik al-Burjiya) or Circassian Mamluks (Arabic: المماليك الشركس, romanized: al-Mamalik al-Sharkas), sometimes referred to as the Burji dynasty, were the rulers of the Mamluk Sultanate of Egypt from 1382 until 1517. As with the preceding Bahri Mamluks, the members of the Burji Mamluk ruling class were purchased as slaves (mamluks) and manumitted, with the most powerful among them taking the role of sultan in Cairo. During this period, the ruling Mamluks were generally of Circassian origin, drawn from the Christian population of the northern Caucasus.

Although sultans typically designated their sons to succeed them after death, the latter rarely lasted more than a few years before being usurped by one of the powerful Mamluk commanders, usually from among the Mamluks purchased by previous sultans. Political power-plays often became important in designating a new sultan.

During this period, the Mamluks fought Timur and conquered Cyprus. Over the course of the 15th century, the sultanate was weakened by infighting and economic decline brought about by multiple factors. Although militarily powerful, they were eventually unable to compete with the more modern army of the Ottoman Empire, leading to their eventual conquest in 1517 by the Ottomans.

== Name ==
The name Burji, meaning 'of the tower', refers to the traditional residence of these Mamluks in the barracks of the Citadel of Cairo.

Arabic sources of the Mamluk period generally called the Mamluk state Dawlat al-Atrak, Dawlat al-Turk, or al-Dawla al-Turkiyya, meaning 'State of the Turks', in reference to the Turkic origins of the Bahri Mamluks who founded the state. However, during Burji rule they also frequently referred to the state as Dawlat al-Jarakisa, meaning 'State of the Circassians', to distinguish the Burji rulers (of mainly Circassian origin) from the former Bahri dynasty. Only rarely during the Burji period did Mamluk writers refer to the rulers' slave ("mamluk") origins.

== History ==
=== Establishment and early challenges ===
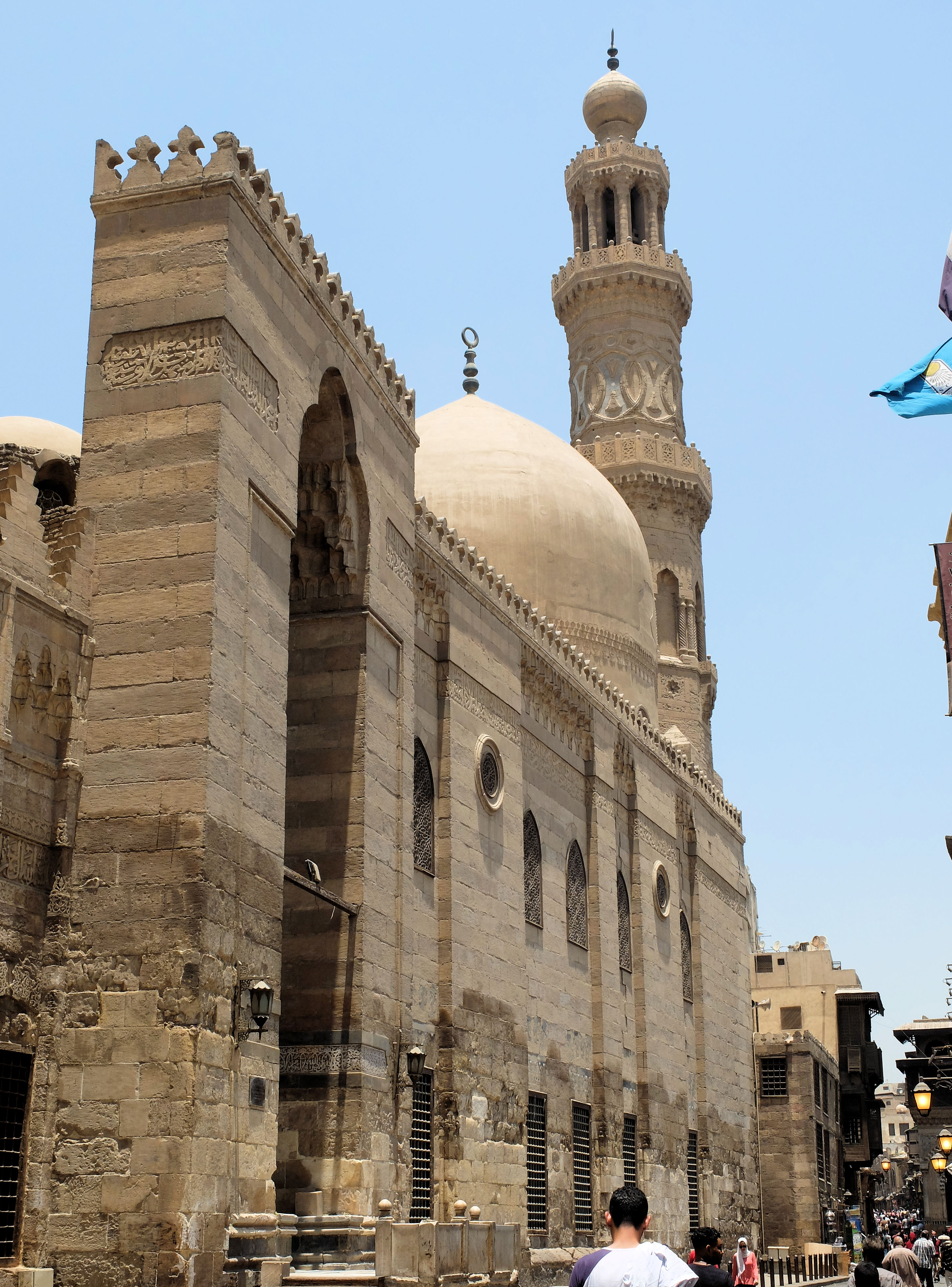
The funerary complex of Sultan Barquq in Cairo, completed in 1386

From 1250, Egypt had been ruled by the first Mamluk dynasty, the mostly Cuman-Kipchak Turkic Bahri dynasty. In 1377 a revolt broke out in Syria which spread to Egypt, and the government was taken over by the Circassians Barakah and Barquq; Barquq was proclaimed sultan in 1382, ending the Bahri dynasty. He was expelled in 1389 but recaptured Cairo in 1390. Early on, the Zahiri Revolt threatened to overthrow Barquq though the conspiracy was discovered before agitators could mobilize. Permanently in power, he founded the Burji dynasty.

Faced with a common enemy, Timur, Barquq joined with Bayezid I and Toktamish in a combined resistance and executed Timur's peace envoys. In the following months Timur was engaged in Georgia and unable to respond to Barquq's actions, while Barquq had died by 1399. In 1401, Timur invaded Syria and sacked Aleppo and Damascus. Syria was regained by Barquq's son, sultan Nasir-ad-Din Faraj, after Timur died in 1405, but Faraj continually faced rebellions from the emirs there and he was forced to abdicate in 1412.

After Faraj, the Abbasid caliph al-Musta'in was permitted to rule the sultanate in Cairo for several months, but the role of sultan was soon taken by another Mamluk, Al-Mu'ayyad Shaykh.

=== Apogee and decline ===
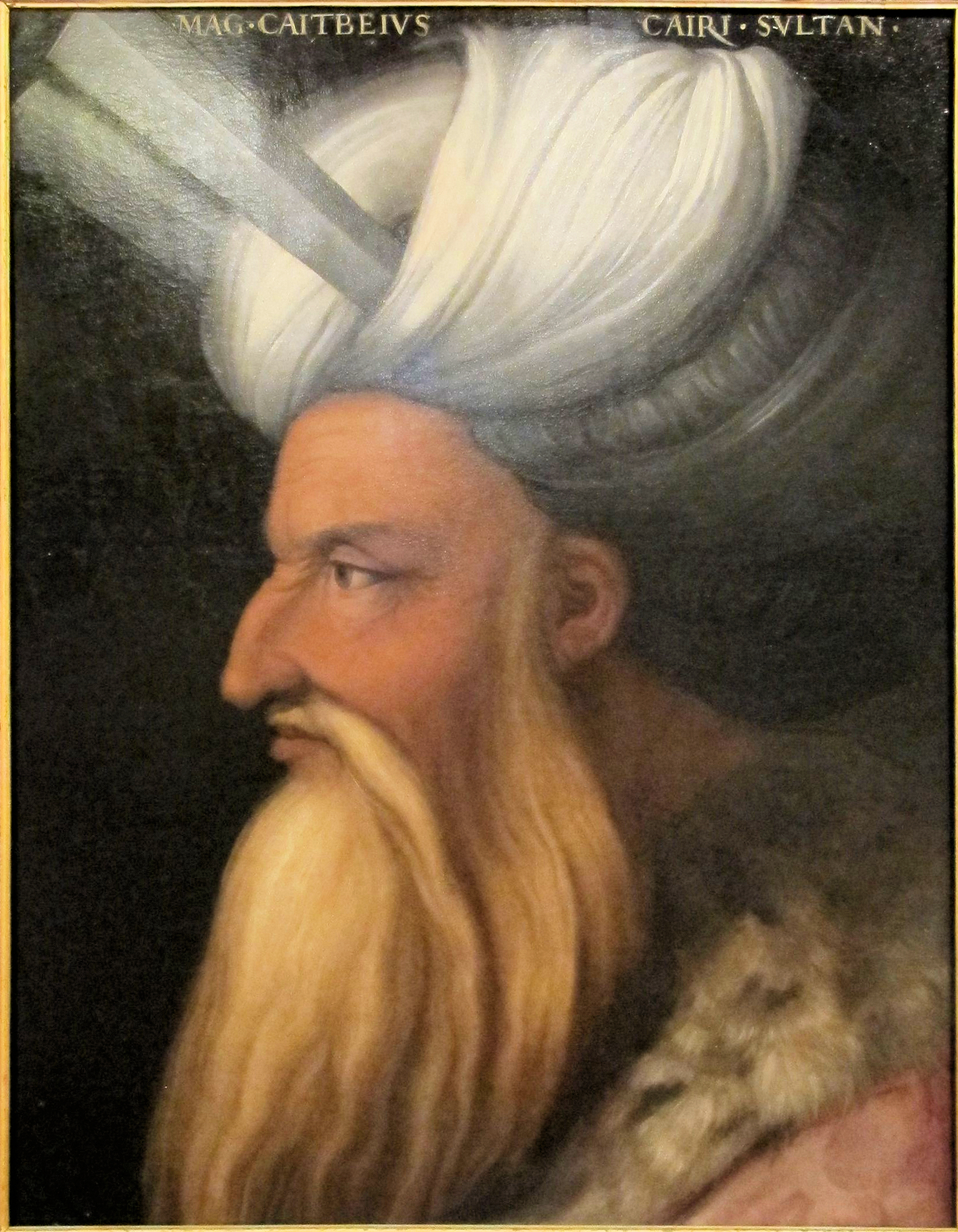
Mamluk Sultan Qaytbay ("Mag Caitbeivs Cairi Svltan") by Florentine painter Cristofano dell'Altissimo (16th century), Galleria degli Uffizi

Under the reign of Sultan Barsbay, the Mamluk Sultanate grew to its widest territorial extent. In 1426, he invaded the Kingdom of Cyprus and forced its kings to become Mamluk vassals. However, Barsbay also introduced a number of economic policies that were damaging in the long term, such as a state monopoly on the spice trade. During Barsbay's reign Egypt's population was greatly reduced from what it had been a few centuries before, with only one fifth of the number of towns. He frequently raided Asia Minor, but died in 1438.

During the reign of Sayf ad-Din Jaqmaq an attempt to conquer Rhodes in 1444 from the Knights of St. John was repelled.

Sayf ad-Din Inal came to power in 1453 and had friendly relations with the Ottoman sultan Mehmed II, who captured Constantinople later that year, causing great celebration in Egypt. The relationship between the Ottomans and the Mamluks became more adversarial after this time. Both states constantly vied for control of the spice trade, and the Ottomans aspired to eventually take control of the Holy Cities of Islam. Under the reign of Khusqadam, of Greek origin, tensions increased. Both Khusqadam and Mehmed II supported different candidates to the principality of Karaman.

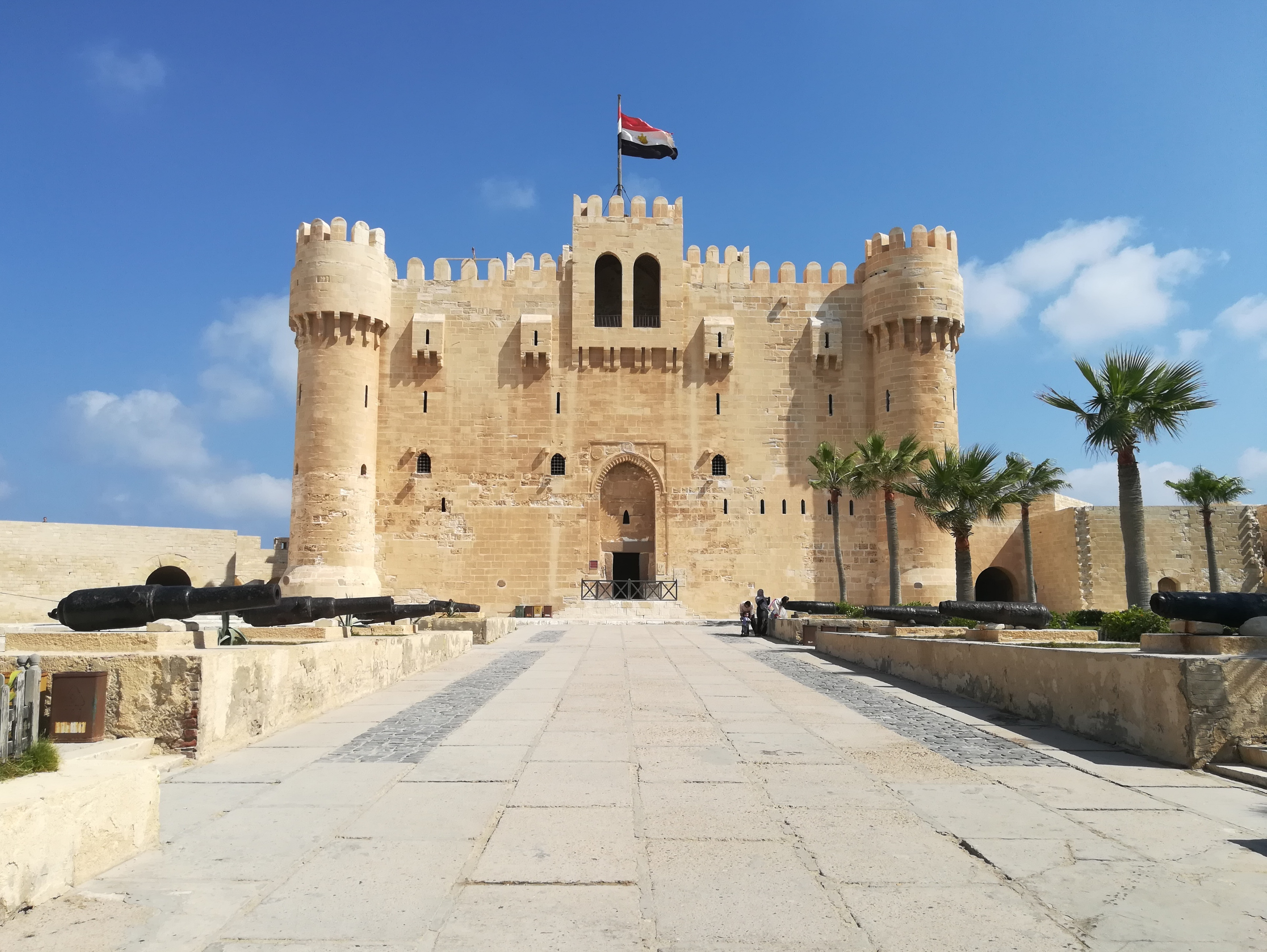
The Citadel of Qaitbay in Alexandria, completed in 1479

After the death of Mehmed II in 1481, Sultan Qaitbay offended the Ottoman sultan Bayezid II by harboring his rebellious brother, Cem. Bayezid II later seized Adana, Tarsus and other places within Mamluk territory, but was unable to defeat the Mamluks during a prolonged war that ended in 1491. Qaitbay also tried to help the Muslims in Spain by threatening the Christians in Syria, but without effect. He died in 1496, leaving several hundred thousand ducats in debts to the great Venetian trading families.

Following another several years of political instability and succession disputes, the last major Mamluk sultan was Qansuh al-Ghuri, who came to power in 1501. While he attempted some reforms, including the introduction of the first military regiment with gunpowder weapons, he was unable to fully integrate them into the Mamluk army and he could not fix the country's economic problems.

=== Conquest by the Ottomans ===
By 1516, the Ottomans were free from other concerns — Sultan Selim I had just vanquished the Safavid Persians at the Battle of Chaldiran in 1514 —and turned their full might against the Mamluks, who still ruled in Syria and Egypt, to complete the Ottoman conquest of the Middle East. Al-Ghuri led his army to confront Selim I's invasion of Syria in 1516, but he died in the Battle of Marj Dabiq and the Mamluk army was routed.

In 1517, the Ottomans completed their conquest with the capture of Cairo on January 22. The centre of power transferred from Cairo to Constantinople. However, the mamluks continued to exist as a political and military class in Ottoman Egypt. While the governors were appointed by the Ottoman sultan, the mamluks vied for influence within the country and held many high political positions. They were finally destroyed and exterminated by Muhammad Ali Pasha during his rise to power in Egypt in the early 19th century.

== Culture ==
Some of the Circassian Mamluks who composed the ruling elite in this period could speak the Circassian language of their origins, but they generally learned Turkish while in Egypt, specifically Kipchak Turkish, as it was the main spoken language among the mamluks during the wider Mamluk Sultanate period. The main language for writing was Classical Arabic, while the common language of the general population was a form of colloquial Arabic. Kipchak Turkish was also used in writing, but to a lesser extent and mainly for a mamluk audience. Over time, it was replaced in this role by Oghuz Turkish due to influence from Turkish Anatolia.

== List of Burji Sultans ==
1. al-Zahir Barquq, mamluk of Yalbugha al-Umari, 1382–1389, 1390–1399 (Note: Bahri sultan as-Salih Hajji II was briefly restored when Barquq was overthrown in a revolt, but he soon returned and claimed the throne.)
2. an-Nasir Faraj, son of Barquq, 1399–1405, 1405–1412 (Note: After Faraj's overthrow, the competing mamluk emirs installed the Abbasid caliph in Cairo, al-Musta'in Billah, as a neutral sultan. He ruled for six months as a powerless figurehead, before being forced to abdicate by Shaykh, who had overcame his rival emirs to claim sultanate himself.)
3. al-Mansur Abd al-Aziz, son of Barquq, 1405
4. al-Mu'ayyad Shaykh, mamluk of Barquq, 1412–1421
5. al-Muzaffar Ahmad, son of Shaykh, 1421
6. az-Zahir Tatar, mamluk of Barquq, 1421
7. as-Salih Muhammad, son of Tatar, 1421–1422
8. al-Ashraf Barsbay, mamluk of Barquq, 1422–1437
9. al-Aziz Yusuf, son of Barsbay, 1437–1438
10. az-Zahir Jaqmaq, mamluk of Barquq, 1438–1453
11. al-Mansur Uthman, son of Jaqmaq, 1453
12. al-Ashraf Inal, mamluk of Barquq, 1453–1461
13. al-Mu'ayyad Ahmad, son of Inal, 1461
14. az-Zahir Khushqadam, mamluk of Shaykh, 1461–1467
15. az-Zahir Bilbay, mamluk of Shaykh, 1467
16. az-Zahir Timurbugha, mamluk of Jaqmaq, 1467–1468
17. al-Ashraf Qaitbay, mamluk of Barsbay, 1468–1496
18. an-Nasir Muhammad, son of Qaitbay, 1496–1498
19. az-Zahir Qansuh, mamluk of Qaitbay, 1498–1500
20. al-Ashraf Janbalat, mamluk of Qaitbay, 1500–1501
21. al-Adil Tuman Bay I, mamluk of Qaitbay, 1501
22. al-Ashraf Qansuh II, mamluk of Qaitbay, 1501–1516
23. al-Ashraf Tuman Bay II, mamluk of Qansuh II, 1516–1517

In 1517, the Ottomans under Sultan Selim I conquered the Mamluk sultanate, bringing an end to the Burji period.

== See also ==
- History of Arab Egypt
- Black Sea slave trade
- History of Ottoman Egypt
- List of Sunni Muslim dynasties

== Notes ==
— Royal house — Burji dynasty
Preceded by Bahri dynasty	Ruling house of Egypt; 1382 – 1517	Succeeded by Ottoman dynasty
