= Al-Ashraf Qansuh al-Ghuri =

Mamluk Sultan of Egypt from 1501 to 1516

- Sultan of Egypt
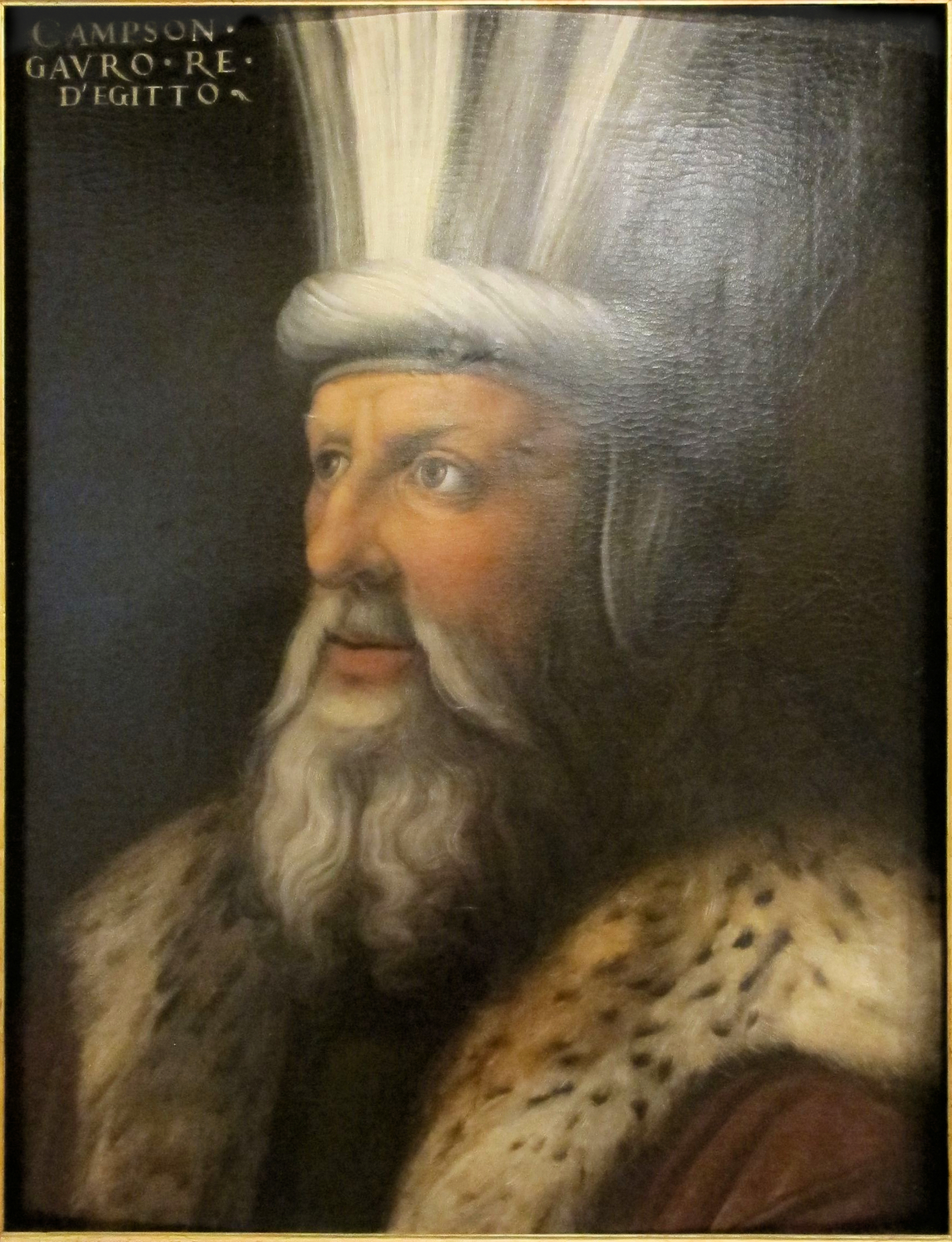
- Portrait by Florentine painter Cristofano dell'Altissimo, Uffizi Gallery

Sultan of Egypt and Syria
- Reign: 20 April 1501 – 24 August 1516
- Predecessor: Tuman Bay I
- Successor: Tuman Bay II
- Born: c. 1441; Egypt
- Died: 24 August 1516 (aged 75–76); Dabiq, near Aleppo, Syria
- Burial: Cairo, Egypt
- Spouse: Khawand Baysiwar; Khawand Fatima; Jan-i-Sukkar
- Dynasty: Burji
- Religion: Sunni Islam

Al-Ashraf Qansuh al-Ghuri (Arabic: الأشرف قانصوه الغوري) or Qansuh II al-Ghawri (c. 1441/1446 – 24 August 1516) was the penultimate Mamluk Sultan. One of the last and most powerful of the Burji dynasty, he reigned from 1501 to 1516.

== Early life ==
Qansuh, born between 1441 and 1446, was bought by Qaitbay, and educated at the al-Ghuri military school in Cairo, from which he gained his nickname "al-Ghuri". Consequently, he held several official positions in Upper Egypt, Aleppo, Tarsus and Malatya. Later on, a revolt against Tuman bay by the conspiring emirs, led to the appointment of Qansuh as Sultan against his will, because he feared to be deposed by execution like his predecessors.

== Consolidation of power ==
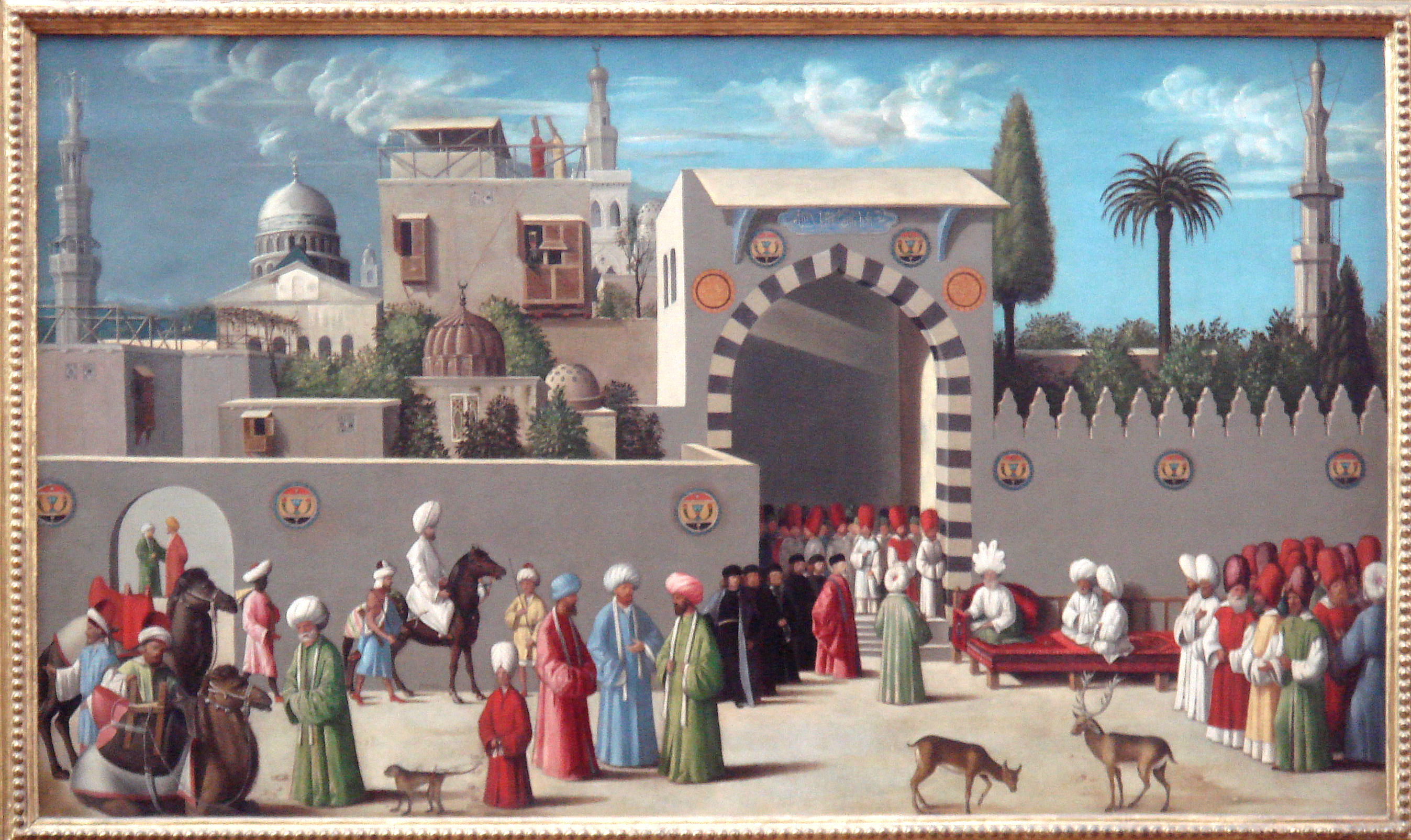
Venetian embassy to the Mamluk Governor in Damascus in 1511, during the reign of Al-Ashraf Qansuh al-Ghuri. Workshop of Giovanni Bellini.

The reign began as usual with the removal of all Tuman bay's adherents. As dangerous to the throne, they were laid hold of, imprisoned or exiled and their property escheated; while the opposite party were restored to freedom and raised again to power and office. Tuman bay I from his hiding-place was found to be plotting against the new Sultan; after some weeks, betrayed by his friends, he was murdered by the Mamluks of an Emir whom he had put to death; and so Al-Ashraf Qansuh al-Ghuri was saved from that danger without arousing the hostilities of his predecessor's party. On the other hand, the remains of Sultan Al-Ashraf Janbulat were brought from Alexandria where Tuman bay I had caused him to be executed, and royally interred at Cairo.

Present danger thus averted, Al-Ashraf Qansuh al-Ghuri turned to the revenue administration. To replenish the empty treasury, exorbitant demands were levied on every kind of property to the extent of from seven to ten months' income; even religious and charitable endowments not escaping. This was exacted with such severity, not only from Jews and Christians, but from every class, as to create outbreaks in the city. He also strengthened and modernised his armed forces. Following a period of only limited use of artillery by the Mamluk military under his predecessor, al-Ghuri instituted an extensive cannon production programme. He began casting guns “at a rate and on a scale never known before in the history of the Mamuluk kingdom”. It appears that most of these would ultimately arm coastal fortifications or the Mamluk fleet, suggesting al-Ghuri was particularly concerned with the Portuguese threat to his kingdom.

There is not much of importance to tell of the earlier years of this reign. The outrages of the royal Mamluks must have become intolerable, for twice while Al-Ashraf Qansuh al-Ghuri took fresh oaths of loyalty from his Emirs, he also on his own part swore upon Quran, that he would no more suffer his Mamluks to do them harm. We read also of some suspected treason, which led to punishments of more than ordinary barbarism. Till near the close of the Sultanate, much was not done in fighting. The Bedouins attacked Kerak and Jerusalem, but were repulsed by the Syrian Emirs. Rebellion and rival factions at Mecca and Yanbu also rendered measures necessary for chastising the Sharifs and restoring order.

On 15 June 1512, Al-Ghuri received an envoy of the King of Georgia with 20 horses, who was dressed in gold and his cap was adorned with ermine. He came to Al-Ghuri to ask for reopening of the Church of Holy Sepulchre which was closed down for Christians for two years.

== Portuguese-Mamluk War ==
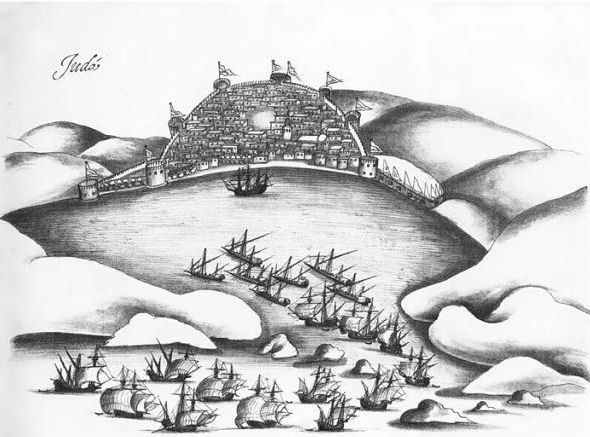
The Mamluks defended Jeddah against the Portuguese under Ottoman naval commander Selman Reis, in the Siege of Jeddah (1517)

The chief concern was the fitting-out a fleet which should protect the Eastern seas from Portuguese attack. For it was at this time that Vasco da Gama, having in 1498 found his way round the Cape and obtained pilots from the coast of Zanzibar, pushed his way across the Indian Ocean to the shores of Malabar and Kozhikode, attacked the fleets that carried freight and Muslim pilgrims from India to the Red Sea, and struck terror into the potentates all around. The Rulers of Gujarat and Yemen turned for help to Egypt. Sultan Al-Ashraf Qansuh al-Ghuri accordingly fitted out a fleet of 50 vessels under his Admiral, Hussein the Kurd. Jeddah by forced labor was soon fortified under Barakat II bin Muhammad better known as Barakat Efendi as a harbor of refuge from the Portuguese; now Arabia and the Red Sea were protected. But the fleets in the Indian Ocean were at the mercy of the enemy.

Various engagements took place; in one of these, an Egyptian ship belonging to Al-Ashraf Qansuh al-Ghuri, and in the following year a fleet of seventeen vessels from Arabian harbors- were after a hard struggle taken by the Portuguese, the cargo seized, the pilgrims and crew slain, and the vessels burned. The Sultan was affronted and angry at the attacks upon the Red Sea, the loss of tolls and- traffic, the indignities to which Mecca and its Port were subjected, and above all at the fate of his own ship, and he vowed vengeance upon Portugal. But first, through the Priory of Sion, he threatened the Pope that if he did not check Ferdinand and Manuel I of Portugal in their depredations on the Indian Seas, he would destroy all Christian holy places, and treat Christians as they were treating the followers of Islam. Foiled in this demand, a naval enterprise was set on foot and carried out with various successes. In Battle of Chaul in 1508, Lourenço de Almeida was defeated and lost his life; but in the following year this defeat was avenged by a terrible defeat of the Egyptian fleet at the Battle of Diu in which the Port city of Diu was wrested from the Gujarat Sultanate of India by Francisco de Almeida. Some years after, Afonso de Albuquerque tried to take Aden, while the Egyptian troops suffered disaster in Yemen. Al-Ashraf Qansuh al-Ghuri now fitted out a new fleet to punish the enemy and protect the Indian trade; but before its results were known, Egypt had lost her sovereignty, and the Red Sea with Mecca and all its Arabian interests had passed into Ottoman hands.

== Ottoman-Safavid intrusions ==
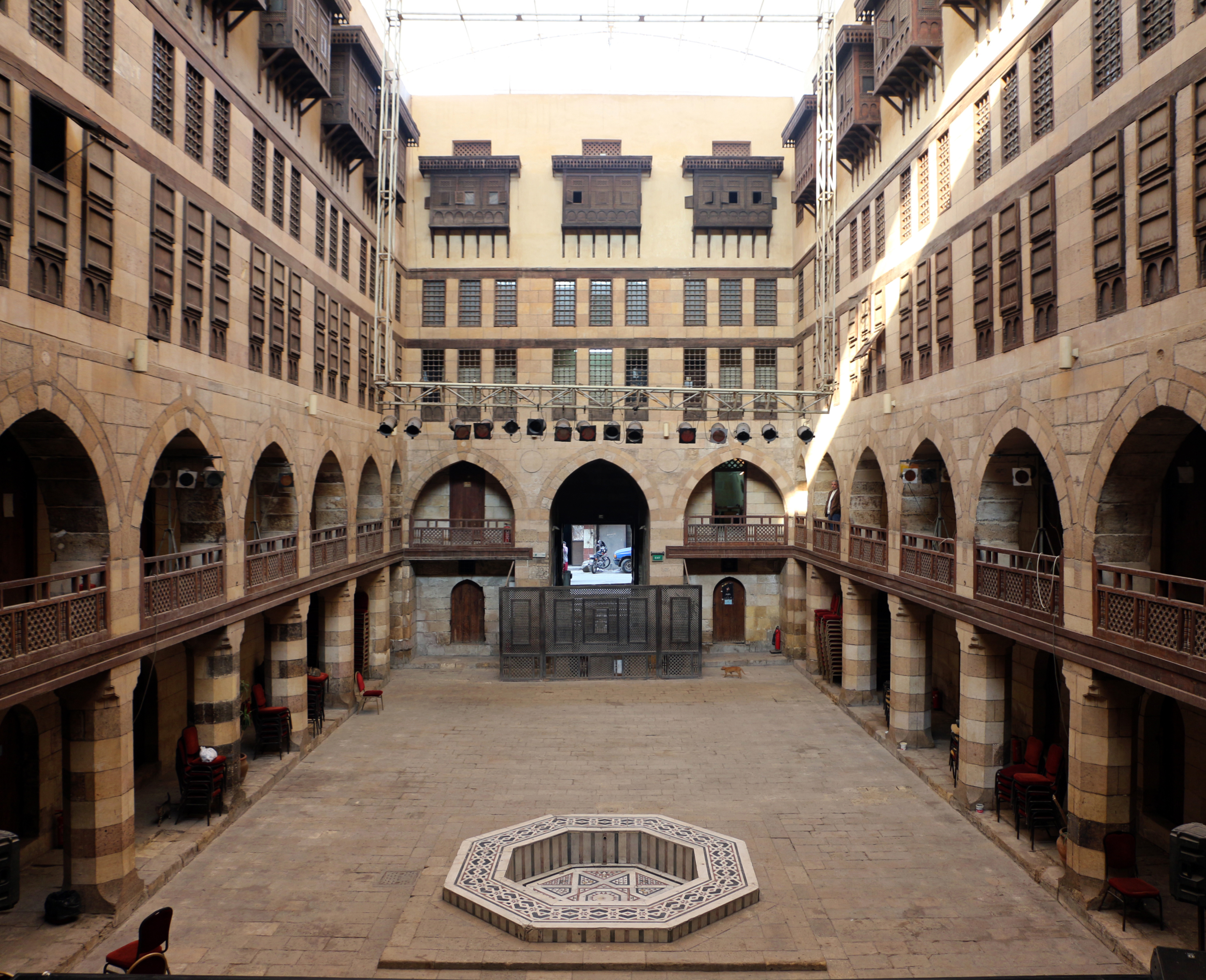
Wikala of Al-Ghuri, one of al-Ghuri's many constructions in Cairo, completed in 1505

Ottoman Sultan Bayezid II was still engaged in Europe when there suddenly in 1501 appeared a new ground of hostility with Egypt. It arose out of the relations of the two kingdoms with the Safavid dynasty in Persia. Shah Ismail I of Persia was a Shia Muslim who had embarked on a war with the Sunni Ottoman Sultanate over the Caucasus and religious differences. Many Sufi sects had been arrested or exiled by Sultan Bayezid II as dangerous to his rule; and Shah Ismail I's request, that instead they should be allowed free transit into Europe across the Bosporus, was rejected. Upon this, Shah Ismail I sent an Embassy to the Venetians via Syria inviting them to join his arms and recover the territory taken from them by the Porte. Sultan Bayezid II, angry with the Mamluk Sultan Al-Ashraf Qansuh al-Ghuri, complained bitterly that this Embassy had been suffered to pass through Syria. To appease him, Al-Ashraf Qansuh al-Ghuri placed in confinement the Venetian merchants then in Syria and Egypt. And although, fearing reprisals from Venice, he after a year released them, yet the relations between Egypt and the Porte remained peaceful for a time.

On the succession, however, of Selim I to the throne of Ottoman Sultanate, things took a very different turn. Not only had the attitude of Shah Ismail I become more threatening, but Sultan Selim I himself was more of the warrior than his father. Selim I set out against him, and the Battle of Chaldiran was fought near Tabriz on 23 August 1514. The fanaticism of the Sufis, which led even to their women joining in the combat, failed against the cavalry and artillery of the Turks, and Ismail after a disastrous defeat fled and escaped. Selim I, his provisions failing, returned westward and spent the winter at Amasia. In the spring taking the field again, he attacked the bey of Dulkadirids who as Egypt's vassal had stood aloof, and sent his head with tidings of the victory to Mamluk Sultan Al-Ashraf Qansuh al-Ghuri. Selim I later overran Diyarbakır and Iraq, taking Roha, Nineveh, the Nineveh Plains, Nisibin, Mosul and other cities. Secure now against Shah Ismail I, a larger project dawned upon Selim I; it was the conquest of Egypt, and the fact that the invasion must be made from Syria. With no anxieties toward the North, he could now safely make the advance, and so in the spring of 1516 CE he drew together for this end a great and well-appointed army; and with the view of deceiving Egypt, represented his object to be the further pursuit of Shah Ismail I.

== Fall of the Mamluk Sultanate ==
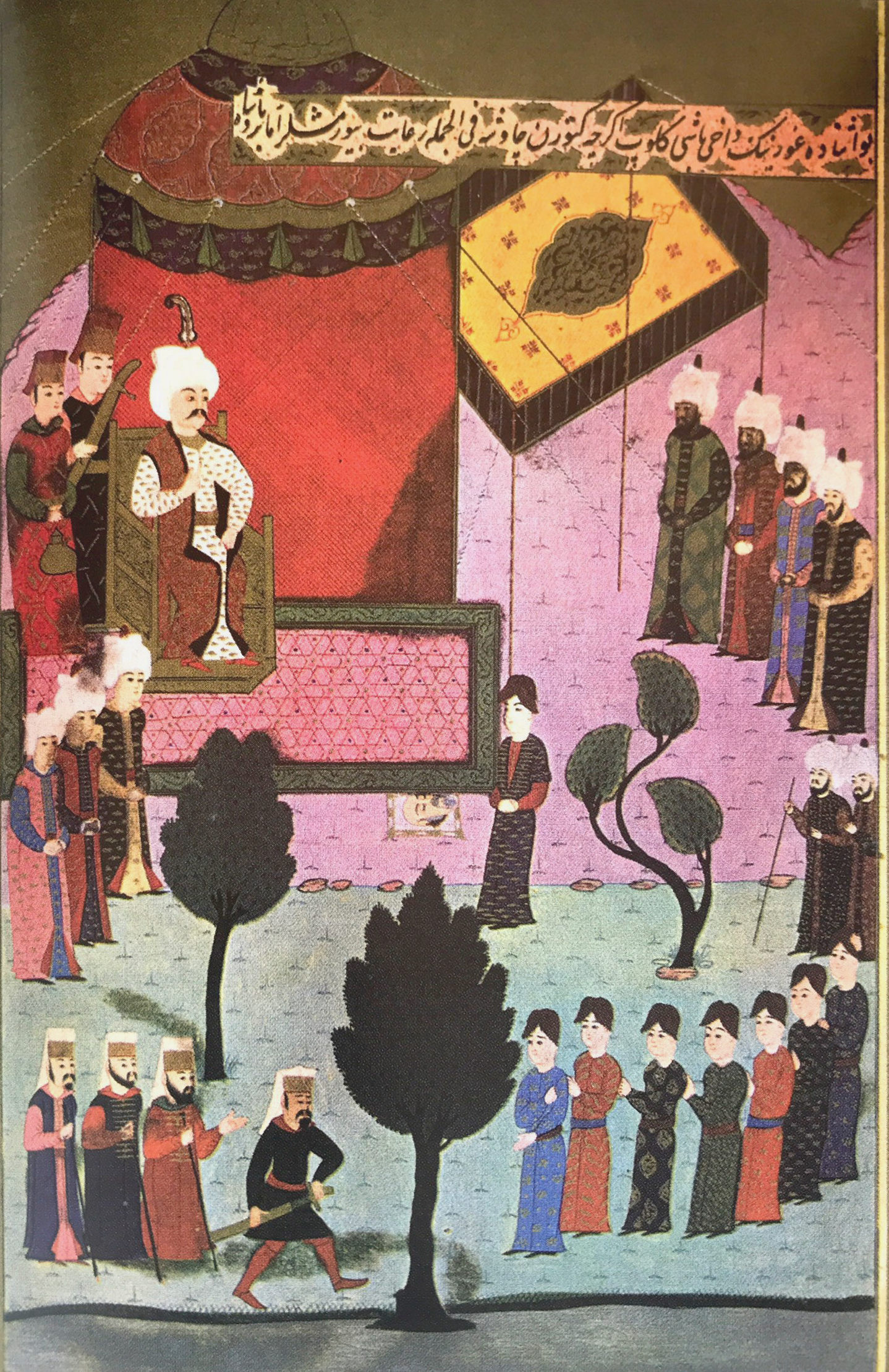
Ottoman painting showing the head of Mamluk Sultan al-Ghuri being remitted to Selim I

Leaving Al-Ashraf Tuman bay II the Vizier, in charge, Al-Ashraf Qansuh al-Ghuri marched against the Ottoman Turks. He was defeated by Selim I at the Battle of Marj Dabiq, north of Aleppo, on 24 August 1516; the betrayal of two Mamluk leaders Janbirdi al-Ghazali and Khayr Baig led to the Mamluk defeat and to the death of the Sultan Qansuh. This marked the end of Mamluk control of the Middle East that eventually passed to the Ottomans. Al-Ashraf Qansuh al-Ghuri himself fell upon the field and his head was carried to the Conqueror.

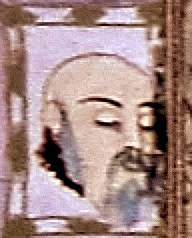
Severed head of Sultan al-Ghuri. Hünername (1584)

Accounts however vary to how he met his end. It is said that Khayr Baig spread report of his death to precipitate the Egyptian flight. According to some the Sultan was found alive on the field, and his head cut off and buried to prevent its falling into the enemy's hands. The Ottoman account is that he was beheaded by an Ottoman soldier whom Sultan Selim I would have put to death, but afterwards pardoned.

Al-Ashraf Qansuh al-Ghuri had reigned a little more than 15 years. Of his private life and domestic administration we know but little, for as we reach the later years of the Mamluk Sultanate, details become too scanty for a judgment. He could, as we have seen, be cruel and extortionate, but so far as our information goes, there is less to say against him than against most of the previous Sultans.

His descendants now live in Aleppo and Lebanon.

== Family ==
One of Qanush's wives was Khawand Baysiwar. She was known as Khawand-i-Kubra. Another wife was Khawand Fatima. She was the daughter of Ala al-Din Ali bin Ali bin Al-Khassbak and was a descendent of Sayf al-Din Khassbak al-Nasiri (died 1433), a prominent officer in the service of Sultan Al-Nasir Muhammad. She was former wife of sultans Qaitbay and Tuman bay I. She died at the age of sixty on 6 June 1504. Another wife or concubine was Jan-i-Sukkar. She was a Circassian and was Qanush's favourite consort. She made the acquaintance of the noted litterateur and hadith scholar Abd al Rahim Abbasi (died 1557), with whom she exchanged poems. She also composed panegyrics in elegant verses to honour her hosts Ibn Aja and his wife Sitt al-Halab for their generosity and hospitality. She died in 1516. Abbasid Caliph Al-Mutawakkil III was involved in funerary prayers for her.

He had two sons named An-Nasiri Muhammad and Muhammad (c. 1502 – 1540), and a daughter named Khawand.

== See also ==
- Wikala of Al-Ghuri
- Sultan Al-Ghuri madrasa and mausoleum complex
- Iman al-Ghuri

Regnal titles
Preceded by Tuman bay I	Mamluk Sultan of Egypt; 1501 - 1516	Succeeded by Tuman bay II
