= Tuman Bay I =

Sultan of Egypt and Syria in 1501

Sultan of Egypt and Syria
- Reign: 25 January – 20 April 1501
- Predecessor: al-Ashraf Janbalat
- Successor: al-Ashraf Qansuh
- Born: Around 1461
- Died: After 1501
- Spouse: Khawand Fatima
- Religion: Sunni Islam

Tuman Bay I (Arabic: الملك العادل أبو النصر طومان باى الأشرفى, romanized: al-Malik al-ʿĀdil Abū al-Naṣr Ṭūmān Bāy al-Ashrafī; c. 1461 – after 1501) was a Burji Mamluk Sultan of Egypt. He ruled for about one hundred days in 1501.

Tuman Bay I was about forty years old when he was selected as Sultan. Although he was popular before becoming a Sultan, he soon lost that popularity due to his cruel measures, which was manifested in condemning an emir to death by hanging for alleged conspiracy. He was overthrown by some revolting mamluks, who then proclaimed Qansuh al-Ghawri as his successor.

He was married to the rich noblewoman Fatima ibn Ali ibn Khassbak (d. 1505), widow of sultan Qaitbay (r. 1468-1497) and sister of Zaynab ibn Ali ibn Khassbak, who was the widow of sultan Inal (r. 1453-1461).

== Sources ==
Regnal titles
Preceded by Janbalat	Mamluk Sultan of Egypt; 1501	Succeeded by Qansuh al-Ghawri
