= 1421 =

1421 in various calendars
- Gregorian calendar: 1421; MCDXXI
- Ab urbe condita: 2174
- Armenian calendar: 870; ԹՎ ՊՀ
- Assyrian calendar: 6171
- Balinese saka calendar: 1342–1343
- Bengali calendar: 827–828
- Berber calendar: 2371
- English Regnal year: 8 Hen. 5 – 9 Hen. 5
- Buddhist calendar: 1965
- Burmese calendar: 783
- Byzantine calendar: 6929–6930
- Chinese calendar: 庚子年 (Metal Rat); 4118 or 3911 — to — 辛丑年 (Metal Ox); 4119 or 3912
- Coptic calendar: 1137–1138
- Discordian calendar: 2587
- Ethiopian calendar: 1413–1414
- Hebrew calendar: 5181–5182
- Hindu calendars
- Vikram Samvat: 1477–1478
- Shaka Samvat: 1342–1343
- Kali Yuga: 4521–4522
- Holocene calendar: 11421
- Igbo calendar: 421–422
- Iranian calendar: 799–800
- Islamic calendar: 823–824
- Japanese calendar: Ōei 28 (応永２８年)
- Javanese calendar: 1335–1336
- Julian calendar: 1421; MCDXXI
- Korean calendar: 3754
- Minguo calendar: 491 before ROC 民前491年
- Nanakshahi calendar: −47
- Thai solar calendar: 1963–1964
- Tibetan calendar: ལྕགས་ཕོ་བྱི་བ་ལོ་ (male Iron-Rat); 1547 or 1166 or 394 — to — ལྕགས་མོ་གླང་ལོ་ (female Iron-Ox); 1548 or 1167 or 395

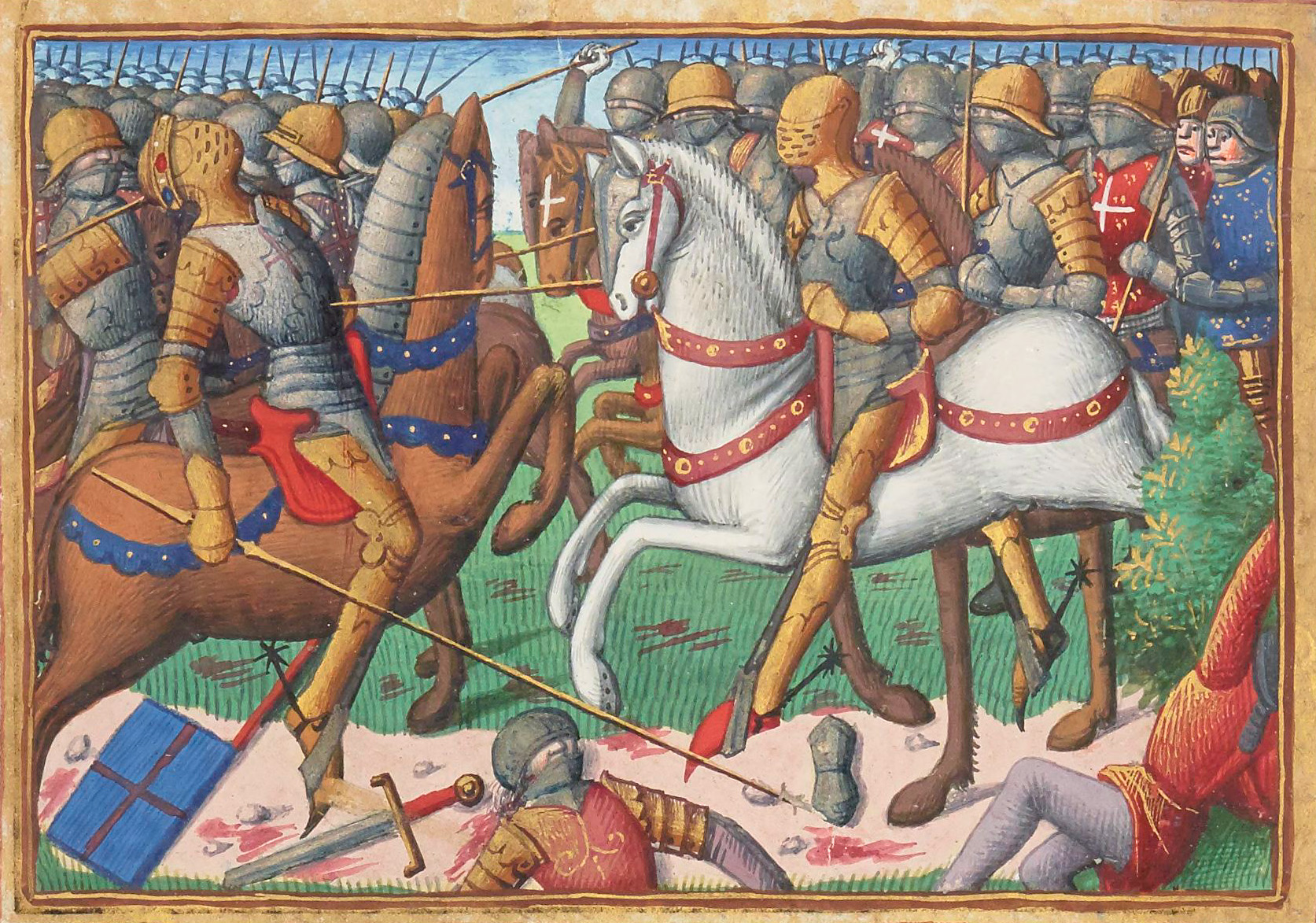
March 22: The English Army is defeated by French and Scottish troops in the Battle of Baugé.

Year 1421 (MCDXXI) was a common year starting on Wednesday of the Julian calendar.

== Events ==
=== January–March ===
- January 13 – Al-Muzaffar Ahmad becomes the Mamluk sultan of Egypt and Syria upon the death of his father, Al-Mu'ayyad Shaykh
- January 19 – The coronation of John VIII Palaiologos as the Emperor of Byzantium, the "Eastern Roman Empire", takes place in Constantinople.
- February 23 – The coronation of Catherine of Valois as Queen consort of England takes place at Westminster Abbey.
- March 3 – Zheng He receives an imperial order from China's Emperor Zhu Di to begin the Ming treasure voyages, carrying imperial letters, silk products and other gifts to various rulers of countries around the Indian Ocean.
- March 12 – In his campaign to rid Germany of Jewish people, Albert V, Duke of Austria issues a death sentence against wealthy Jews who had been imprisoned as part of his order of May 23, 1420. On March 12, the burning at the stake of 120 women and 92 men is carried out south of the city walls of Vienna.
- March 17 – 12 Rabi al-Awwal 824 AH: Ibrahim ibn Hasan ibn Ajlan and his brother Barakat ibn Hasan are confirmed by the Mamluk Egyptian Sultan Al-Muzaffar Ahmad as co-Emirs of Mecca.
- March 21 – Battle of Baugé: A small French force, led by Gilbert Motier de La Fayette, surprises and defeats a smaller English force under Thomas of Lancaster, Duke of Clarence, a brother of King Henry V of England, in Normandy. Thomas, heir to the throne and Crown Prince, is killed in the attack, along with about 1,000 other of men.

=== April–June ===
- April 8 – Maredudd ab Owain Glyndŵr, son of the Welsh rebel Owain Glyndŵr, accepts a pardon from, and swears loyalty to England's King Henry V, formally bringing an end to the Glyndŵr rebellion.
- April 12 – Hedwig Jagiellon, the 13-year-old daughter of and heiress presumptive to Wladyslaw II, King of Poland, is betrothed in a marriage contract to Prince Frederick, the 7-year-old son of Frederick I, Elector of Brandenburg as part of an alliance between Poland and Brandenburg during the Brandenburg–Pomeranian conflict. The marriage is scheduled to take place after November 19, 1427, when Prince Frederick is to be 14 years old, at which time he will live in Poland and become eligible to serve with Hedwig as ruler of Poland and Lithuania. The marriage will never take place, and the contract is annulled in 1424 when a male heir to the Polish throne, Wladyslaw, is born.
- April 24 – The Sedlec Abbey, a monastery for the Cistercians order in Bohemia, is looted and burned by Hussites led by Jan Žižka, and several of the monks inside are killed.
- May 26 – Mehmed I, Sultan of the Ottoman Empire, dies and is succeeded by his son, Murad II.
- June 10 – One year after returning home for his marriage to Catherine of Valois, and in the English defeat in the Battle of Baugé, King Henry V of England sails back to France with new troops to continue fighting in the Hundred Years' War.
- June 25 – Prince Charles of Valois, the oldest son of King Charles VI and former Dauphin before being disinherited by his father, captures the English fortress at Gallardon and has the entire garrison executed for treason, and then retakes Chartres.

=== July–September ===
- July 2 – At Erciş in what is now Turkey, Iskandar ibn Yusuf is crowned as the Sultan of Qara Qoyunlu, a kingdom encompassing what are now eastern Turkey, northwestern Iran and northern Iraq, northern Armenia and all of Azerbaijan.
- July 15 – A ceasefire is declared in the Great Frisian War as the representatives warring parties agree to a treaty at the city of Greetsiel in what is now the German region of Ostfriesland. A boundary is set at the Lauwers River in the Netherlands with the territory to the west (Friesland) going to the Frisian rebel group, the Skieringers. The lands to the east Groningen go the Fetkeapers.
- August 5 – At the Battle of Brüx, Hussite troops led by Jan Želivský, are defeated by the German Saxon baron Frederick of Meissen at what is now the city of Most in what is now the Czech Republic.
- August 29 – Sayf al-Din Tatar, becomes the new Mamluk Sultan of Egypt and Syria after leading a coup d'état overthrowing and imprisoning his brother, Al-Muzaffar Ahmad.
- September 12– In what is now South Korea, Taejong of Goryeo, King of Joseon from 1400 to 1418, then King Emeritus since 1418, is crowned as the first Grand King Emeritus of Joseon.
- September 28– A treaty is signed at Vienna between Sigismund, King of Hungary, Croatia, Bohemia and Germany and Albert V, Duke of Austria for Sigismund's daughter Elizabeth of Luxembourg, to marry Albert (on April 19, 1422) and confirming Elizabeth's rights as heiress presumptive to the thrones of Hungary and Bohemia.

=== October–December ===
- October 20–King Henry V summons the English Parliament for the last time in his life, directing the members to assemble at Westminster on December 1.
- November 17–19 – St. Elizabeth's flood: The coastal area near Dordrecht in the Netherlands is flooded, due to the extremely high tide of the North Sea; 72 villages are drowned, killing about 10,000 people, and the course of the Meuse is changed.
- November 30 – Al-Nasir al-Din Muhammad becomes the fourth Mamluk Sultan of Egypt and Syria in less than a year when his father Sayf al-Din Tatar, dies after only three months on the throne.
- December 1 – The 11th and last Parliament of King Henry V assembles at Westminster and elects Richard Baynard as Speaker of the House of Commons.
- December 21 – Hussite Wars: At the Battle of Kutná Hora, the Bohemian Hussites led by Jan Zizka, and using the best weapons available, force the exit of the crusaders of the Holy Roman Empire. Among the new wespons developed by Zizka's officers are the "war wagon", a vehicle with reinforced sides and small openings from which guns can be fired.
- December 26 – In India, Ahmad Shah I, the Sultan of Gujarat and his troops, camped at Sarangpur, resist a surprise counter-attack by the army of the Malwa Sultanate, led by the Sultan Hoshang Shah.

=== Date unknown ===
- John III of Dampierre, Marquis of Namur, sells his estates to Philip the Good, Duke of Burgundy.
- The first patent is issued by the Republic of Florence.
- Portuguese sailors sent by Prince Henry the Navigator cross Cape Non, going as far as Cape Bojador.
- Traditional date – Larabanga Mosque is founded, in modern-day northern Ghana.

== Births ==
- March 9 – Francesco Sassetti, Italian banker (d. 1490)
- May 29 – Charles, Prince of Viana (d. 1461)
- June 3 – Giovanni di Cosimo de' Medici, Italian noble (d. 1463)
- July 25 – Henry Percy, 3rd Earl of Northumberland, English politician (d. 1461)
- August 1 – Thomas Dutton, English knight (d. 1459)
- October 10 – John Paston, English politician (d. 1466)
- December 6 – King Henry VI of England (d. 1471)
- date unknown – Sōgi, Japanese poet and Buddhist priest (d. 1502)

== Deaths ==
- January 10 – Niccolò I Trinci, lord of Foligno (assassinated)
- January 15 – Helvis of Brunswick-Grubenhagen, queen consort of Armenia and Cyprus (born 1353)
- March 22 – Thomas of Lancaster, Duke of Clarence, second son of Henry IV of England (killed in battle) (born 1388)
- April 21 – John FitzAlan, 13th Earl of Arundel (born 1385)
- May – Balša III, ruler of Zeta
- May 26 – Mehmed I, Ottoman Sultan (b. 1389)
- June 21 – Jean Le Maingre, marshal of France (b. 1366)
