= 1453 events =

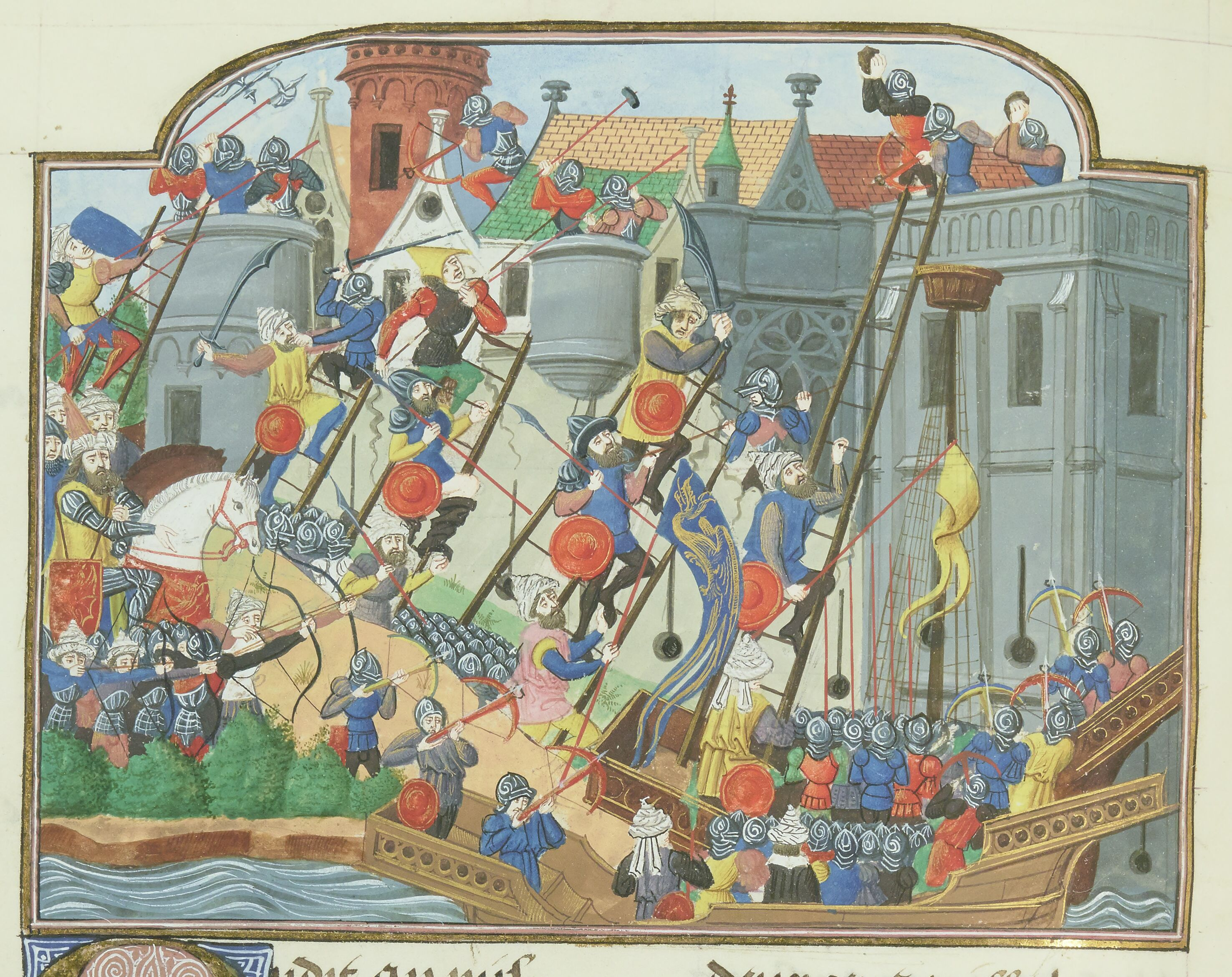
May 29: The Ottoman Turks conquer Constantinople, bringing the Byzantine Empire to an end.

Year 1453 (MCDLIII) was a common year starting on Monday of the Julian calendar, the 1453rd year of the Common Era (CE) and Anno Domini (AD) designations, the 453rd year of the 2nd millennium, the 53rd year of the 15th century, and the 4th year of the 1450s decade.

== Events ==
=== January–March ===
- January 9 – Stefano Porcari, arrested earlier in the week by soldiers from the Papal States, is executed for his attempt to overthrow Pope Nicholas V.
- January 20 – King Henry VI of England summons the members of the House of Commons and the House of Lords to assemble on March 6 at Reading.
- January 26 – As the Ottoman Empire is increasing its number of troops in Byzantium, mercenary troops from the Republic of Genoa, commanded by Giovanni Giustiniani, arrive in Constantinople to join with Venetian troops already present.
- February 1 – Al-Mansur Fakhr al-Din Uthman becomes the new Sultan of Egypt and Syria upon the abdication of his father, the Sultan Sayf al-Din Jaqmaq, but will reign for only six weeks.
- February 28 – René of Anjou, the Duke of Lorraine since 1431 and former King of Naples, turns control of the Duchy of Lorraine to his son, Jean II, Duke of Calabria.
- March 6 – The English Parliament opens its session at Reading after being summoned by King Henry VI.
- March 9 – Carlo Gonzaga, Captain of the People in the Republic of Milan, leads 4,000 soldiers in an invasion of Mantua and the properties of his brother Ludovico III Gonzaga, seizing Castelbelforte and Bigarello. Ludovico responds by assembly his own army with 3,000 cavalry and 500 infantry, forcing Carlos to retreat.
- March 15 – Sayf al-Din Inal deposes Sultan Al-Mansur and puts him in prison. Sayf al-Din becomes the new Mamluk Sultan of Egypt and Syria.
- March 17 – In Poland, Przemysław of Toszek, Duke of Oświęcim, takes responsibility for the brief war by his brother Jan IV against King Caasimir IV, frees all prisoners of war taken in the conflict, and agrees to pay 2,800 florins to King Casimir compensation for the damages sustained.

=== April–June ===
- April 6 – The Ottoman Empire declares war against the Byzantines, beginning the Siege of Constantinople.
- April 18 – Ottoman forces, led by Sultan Mehmed II, launch their first assault against Constantinople.
- April 22 – The Ottoman Army commanded by Ibrahim Pasha, invades Albania and is defeated at the Battle of Polog, losing most of its force of 14,000 men, including Ibrahim himself, while the Albanians, led by Skanderbeg, lose only 300 troops.
- May 29 – Ottoman forces capture Constantinople, destroying the Byzantine Empire—the successor state of the Roman Empire.
- June 14 – Ludovico Gonzaga of Mantua defends the city against Venetian forces led by his brother Carlo.

=== July–September ===
- July 9 – The Giant Bible of Mainz is completed.
- July 17 – The French destroy the English army at the Battle of Castillon.
- July 23 – The Burgundian army led by Duke Philip the Good defeats the rebel forces of Ghent at the Battle of Gavere
- August 15 – The Battle of Ghedi is fought in Lombardy as the Duchy of Milan army, led by Francesco Sforza, defeats the troops of the Republic of Venice, led by Jacopo Piccinino.
- August 24 – With 700 men in his command, Thomas Percy, son of the Earl of Northumberland, attacks the wedding party of Thomas Neville, son of the Earl of Salisbury, and Maud Stanhope at Heworth, York.
- August – French forces led by René of Anjou arrive in the Piedmont, seeking to assist Milan and Florence against Venice.
- September 30 – Pope Nicholas V issues a crusading bull against the Ottoman Empire.

=== October–December ===
- October 10 – René of Anjou, the French Duke of Anjou who had been the King of Naples from 1435 to 1442, and Duke of Lorraine from 1431 until February 28, declares war on the Republic of Venice.
- October 20 – The last English holdouts in Gascony (including Bordeaux) surrender to France, ending the Hundred Years' War.
- October 28 – At the age of 12, Ladislaus the Posthumous is crowned at Prague as the King of Bohemia.
- November 10 – Hwangbo In, the Yeonguijeong (prime minister to the King of Korea) and the Jwauijeong (second minister), General Kim Chongsŏ, are assassinated in a coup d'état led by the heir to the throne Grand Prince Suyang.
- December 5 – Frederick III, Holy Roman Emperor, orders the Prussian Confederation to yield to the demands of the Teutonic Order.

== Births ==
- January 6 – Girolamo Benivieni, Italian poet
- March 2 – Johannes Engel, German doctor, astronomer and astrologer
- September 1 – Gonzalo Fernández de Córdoba, Spanish general and statesman
- October 13 – Edward of Westminster, Prince of Wales, only son of Henry VI
- October 25 – Giuliano de' Medici, Italian nobleman
- November 7 – Filippo Beroaldo, philosopher and scholar
- November 15 – Alfonso, Prince of Asturias

=== Date unknown ===
- Afonso de Albuquerque, Portuguese naval and military commander
- Firdevsī-i Rūmī, Turkish poet
- Shin Mahasilavamsa, Burmese poet
- Sultan-Khalil, Sultan of the Aq Qoyunlu

== Deaths ==
- January 9 – Stefano Porcari, Italian nobleman and humanist politician
- February 13 – Sayf al-Din Jaqmaq, Egyptian Mamluk sultan
- May 29
  - Constantine XI Palaiologos, Byzantine emperor
  - Demetrios Palaiologos Metochites, Byzantine noble and ambassador
  - Orhan Çelebi, Ottoman prince
- June 2 or June 3 – Loukas Notaras, Byzantine statesman and naval commander
- June 22 – Álvaro de Luna, Spanish knight and statesman
- July – Jacques de Lalaing, Burgundian knight
- July 17
  - John Talbot, 1st Earl of Shrewsbury, English nobleman and military leader
  - John Talbot, 1st Viscount Lisle, English nobleman, son of the Earl of Shrewsbury
- December 16 – Zhu Jianji, Crown prince of Ming Dynasty China
- December 24 – John Dunstaple, English composer

=== Date unknown ===
- Dmitry Shemyaka, claimant to the Principality of Moscow
- Giovanni Giustiniani, Genoese mercenary
- Nguyễn An, Vietnamese-born Ming Dynasty court eunuch and architect
- Sophia of Lithuania, Grand Princess of Moscow
