= Sayf al-Din Jaqmaq =

Sultan of Egypt and Syria (r. 1438–1453)

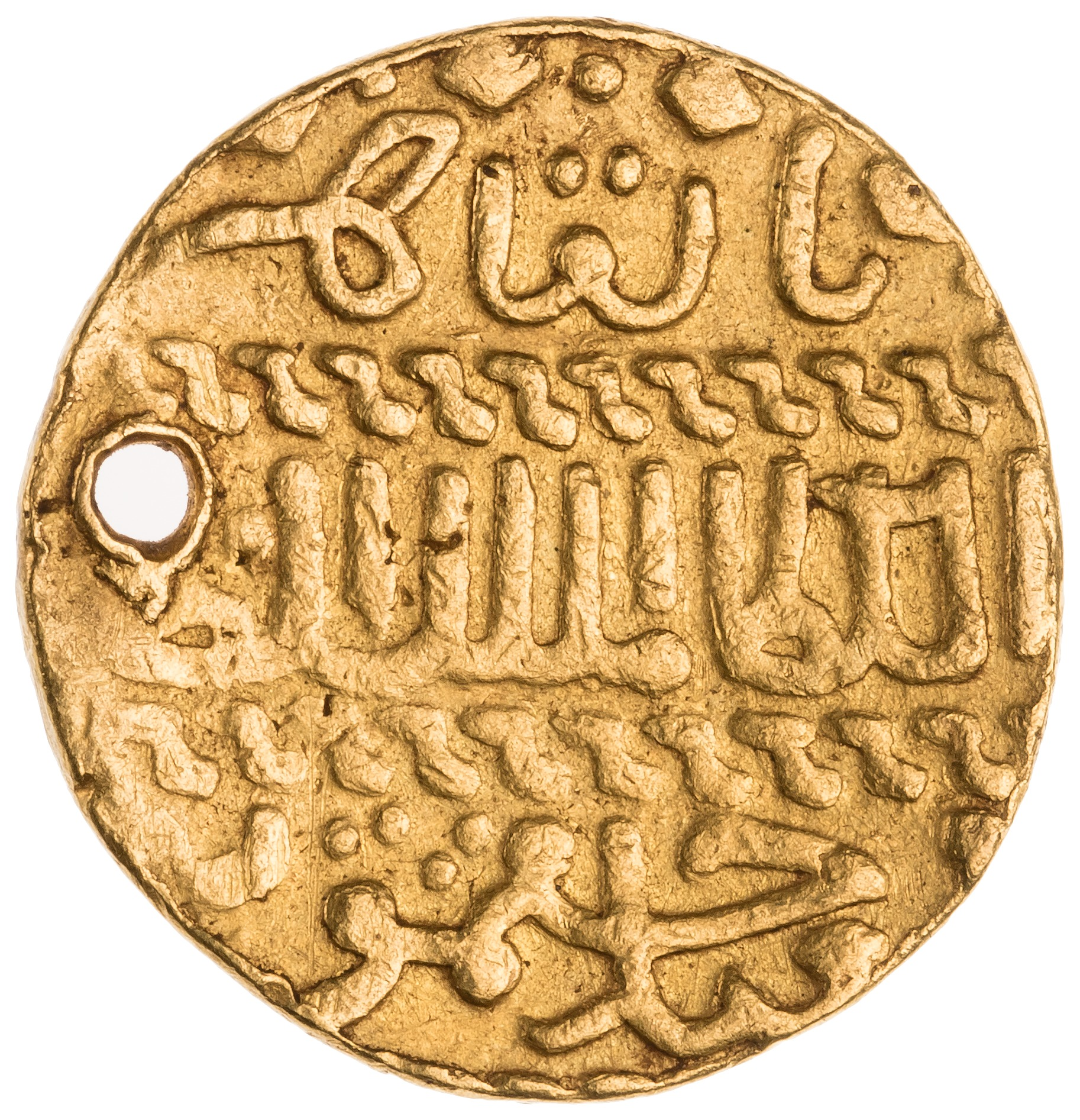
- Gold dinar of Mamluk sultan Jaqmaq minted in Cairo between 1438 and 1440

Sultan of Egypt and Syria
- Reign: 9 September 1438 – 1 February 1453
- Predecessor: Al-Aziz Jamal al-Din Yusuf
- Successor: Al-Mansur Fakhr al-Din Uthman
- Born: 1373
- Died: 13 February 1453 (aged 79–80)
- Spouse: Khawand Mughal; Khawand Shahzada; Khawand Zaynab; Khawand Nafisa; Khawand Jansuwar; Surbay; Jawhar al-Handar; Khawand Jolban; Dolaybay; Khawand Zahra
- Issue: Al-Mansur Fakhr al-Din Uthman; Ahmed; Muhammad; Khawand Khadija; Khawand Fatima; Sitti Sara

Sayf al-Din Jaqmaq (Arabic: الظاهر سيف الدين جقمق; 1373 – 13 February 1453) was the Mamluk sultan of Egypt from 9 September 1438 to 1 February 1453.

== Early life and career ==
Jaqmaq was of Circassian descent. He was brought to Egypt by his older brother and sold to atabeg Inal Al-Yusufi during the reign of Sultan Barquq. He later trained in the Cairo Citadel to join the Khasikiya (Sultan's Guards). He then worked as a cupbearer for Sultan An-Nasir Faraj.

Later on, he became the Mamluk na'ib of Damascus during the reign of Al-Mu'ayyad Shaykh in 1418–1420, in which he built Khan Jaqmaq. Then he became na'ib of the Cairo Citadel under Sultan Sayf al-Din Tatar. Afterwards, he became atabeg under Sultan Barsbay, in which he led a campaign to repress the revolt of Beylik of Dulkadir in Anatolia. He earned Barsbay's trust to become the guardian of his son Al-Aziz Jamal al-Din Yusuf. In 1438, Sultan Barsbay died and left the throne to his son Yusuf who was only fifteen years old. Jaqmaq organized a plot by which he ousted Yusuf to become the new sultan at age sixty five.

== Reign ==
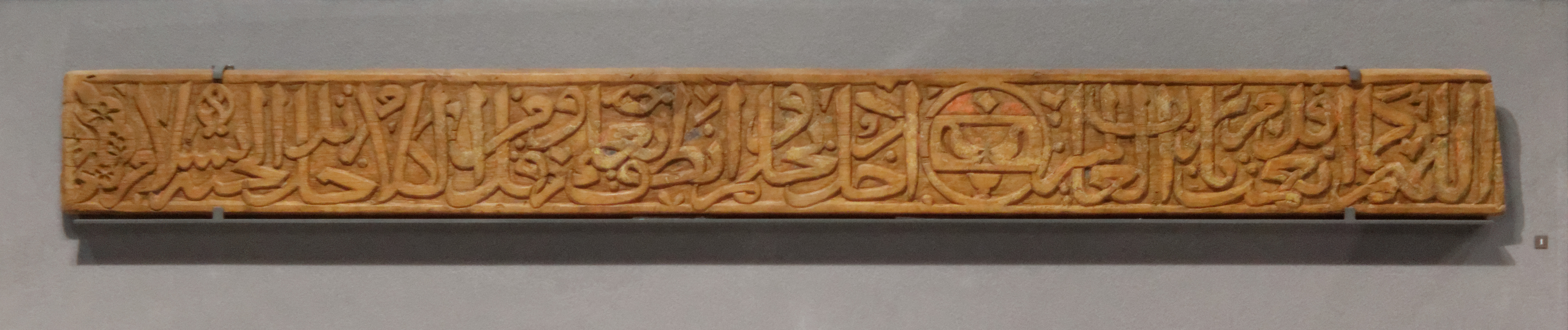
A frieze with the coat of arms of Sultan Jaqmaq at Louvre.

Upon becoming the new sultan, a revolt erupted, led by Emir Korkmaz Al-Sha'abani. However, Jaqmaq distributed gold to both his supporters and those of Korkmaz; the latter found himself abandoned by all. Jaqmaq had him arrested and executed in Alexandria.

Jaqmaq had later to face the uprising of the emirs of Syria. The governors of Damascus, Inal Al-Jakmi, and Aleppo, Tagri Barmash, rallied to Yusuf who managed to escape from Cairo. Yusuf was recaptured and Jaqmaq exiled him to Alexandria. Jaqmaq sent an army led by Akabgha Al-Tamrazi to fight the rebellious emirs who were eventually defeated and captured.

Afterwards, Jaqmaq also had to deal with piracy from the Christian Kingdom of Cyprus and Hospitaller Rhodes. In 1439, Jaqmaq launched a campaign against these two islands but without much success. A second failure in 1442, encouraged him to build a fleet capable of leading a real assault against Rhodes. In July 1444, his fleet left from Egypt to attack Rhodes whose villages were destroyed but the fortress resisted until the fleet commander finally abandoned the siege. After that failure, Jaqmaq remained in peace with his neighbors.

Shahrukh Mirza, son and successor of Timur, sent an embassy to Cairo. He asked Jaqmaq for permission to provide the Kiswah for Kaaba. Jaqmaq initially refused and then accepted the offer despite public opposition. When Shah Rukh's ambassador, a widow of Timur, arrived in Cairo with the Kiswah, she was received by throwing stones. Jaqmaq repressed the revolt and allowed the ambassador to go to Mecca. However, the Kiswah she brought only covered the Kaaba for one day.

In 1453, Jaqmaq, aged eighty years, died after appointing his son Fakhr al-Din Uthman, who was named after the Ottomans, as successor.

== Family ==
Jaqmaq's first wife was Khawand Mughul. She was born in 1403. She was the daughter of judge and confidencial secretary Nasir al-Din ibn al-Birizi, and had been previously married thrice, one of them being a judge. Her second marriage had been arranged by Sultan Al-Mu'ayyad Shaykh despite her father's objections. She had a brother named Kamal al-Din Muhammad, and a sister named Zaynab (died 10 July 1470). Together they had a daughter, Khadijah (1433–34 – 30 January 1463), who married Atabag Azbak on 13 March 1450. Jaqmaq divorced her in September–October 1438, acting on rumors that she had cursed his favorite slave girl Surbay and thus caused her death a month before. She then moved from al-Qa'a al-Kubra to Qa'at al-Barbariyya before she left the citadel for her brother's house. She died on 14 May 1472, and was buried in the courtyard of the mausoleum of Imam al-Shafi'i.

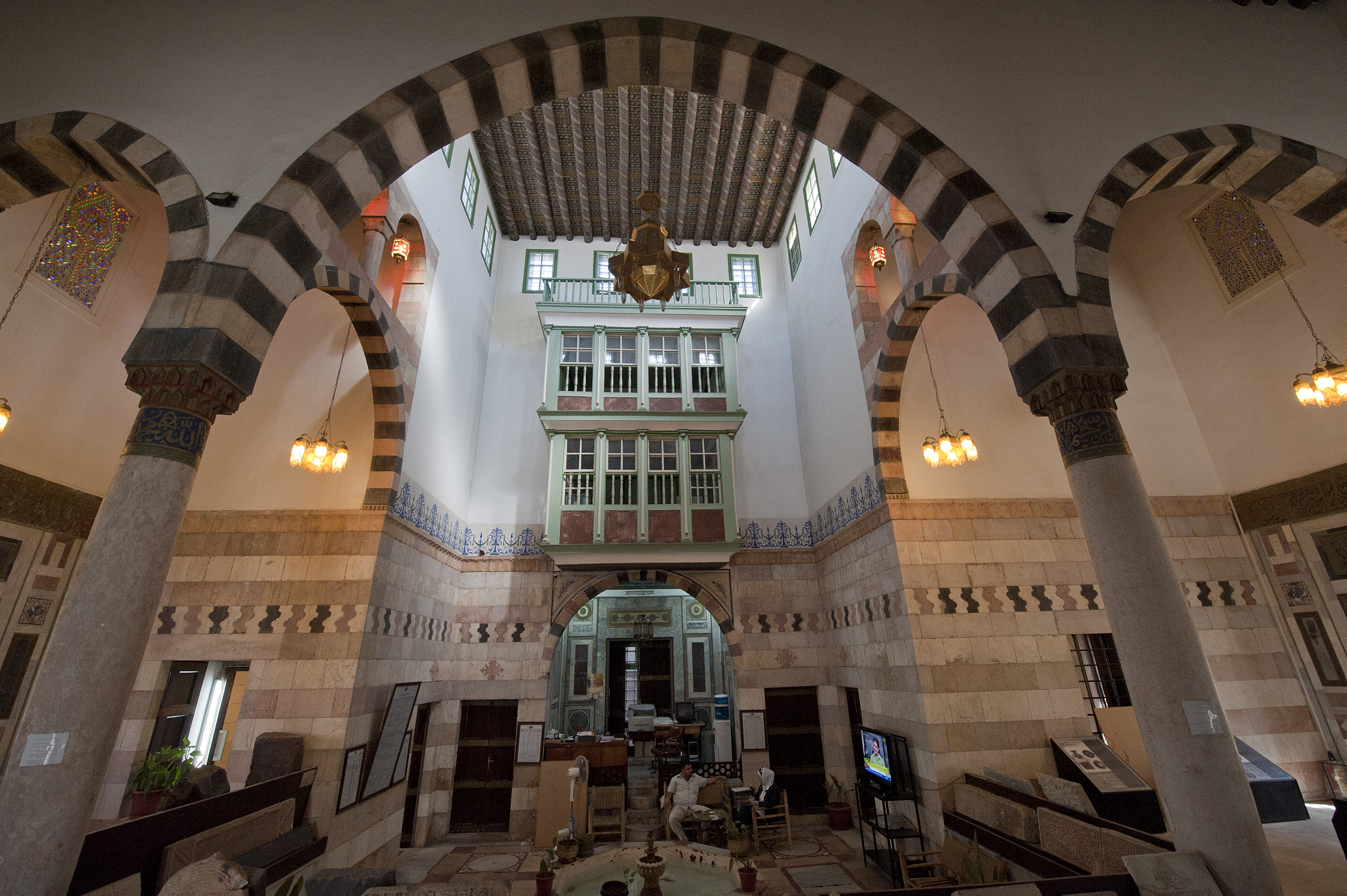
Madrasa Al-Jaqmaqiyya in Damascus

In December 1438, he married Khawand Zaynab, the daughter of Amir Jarbash al-Karimi. Her mother was Fatima Umm Khawand (died 26 April 1487), the daughter of Qani Bay, son of Sultan Barquq's sister. She died in 1459, and was buried in Sultan Barquq's madrasa in Bayn al-Qasrayn. Another wife was Khawand Nafisa, also known as Khawand at-Turkmaniya. She was the daughter of Dulkadirid ruler Nasireddin Mehmed Bey, and had been previously married to Janibek as-Sufi. They married in 1440. She had a daughter. She died of plague on 15 April 1449.

Another wife was Khawand Jansuwar, the daughter of Giritbay, a Circassian amir. They married in December 1449–January 1450. Another wife was Khawand Shahzada. She was the daughter of Ottoman Prince Orhan Çelebi, son of Süleyman Çelebi, who was himself the son of Sultan Bayezid I. She had a younger brother named Süleyman Çelebi. She had been previously married to Sultan Barsbay. The two together had four sons. All of them died of plague at Cairo on 26 March 1449. The eldest one, named Ahmed being seven years old. Jaqmaq divorced her on 25 December 1450. Another wife was the daughter of Naziru'l-Jaysh Kadi Abdulbasit. They married in April 1451. Another wife was the daughter of Süleyman Bey, ruler of the Dulkadirid. After Jaqmaq's death, she married Sultan Al-Mu'ayyad Shihab al-Din Ahmad. She died on 27 April 1460.

One of his concubines was Surbay. She was a Circassian and was his favourite concubine. She died in 1438, and was buried at the mausoleum of Qanibay al-Jarkasi. Some other concubines were Jawhar al-Handar and Khawand Jolban. With one of these concubines, he had a son Muhammad and with the other, he had a daughter Fatima. Another concubine was Dolaybay. Jaqmaq married her to the deputy of Damascus, Barquq. With him, she had one child, Alaybay. His son Sultan al-Mansur Fakhr al-Din Uthman was born of a Greek concubine named Khawand Zahra. She was buried in a madrasa built by her son at Bab al-Bahr. He had another daughter, born of a Circassian concubine. His son, Muhammad was married to Khadija, daughter of Aqtuwah, a Circassian and a relative of Sultan Barsbay. Another daughter was Sitti Sara.

== See also ==
- Khan Jaqmaq

== Sources ==
- Clot, André (2009). L'Égypte des Mamelouks 1250-1517. L'empire des esclaves (in French). Paris: Perrin. ISBN 978-2-262-03045-2.
- Natho, Kadir I. (2009). Circassian History. Xlibris Corporation. ISBN 9781465316998.
- Karam, Amina (2019-05-22). "Women, Architecture and Representation in Mamluk Cairo". AUC DAR Home. Archived from the original on 2021-12-18.

Regnal titles
Preceded by Al-Aziz Jamal al-Din Yusuf	Mamluk Sultan of Egypt; 9 September 1438–1 February 1453	Succeeded by Al-Mansur Fakhr al-Din Uthman
