= Khanqah-Mausoleum of Sultan Barsbay =

Islamic funerary complex in Cairo, Egypt

- خانقاه الأشرف برسباي
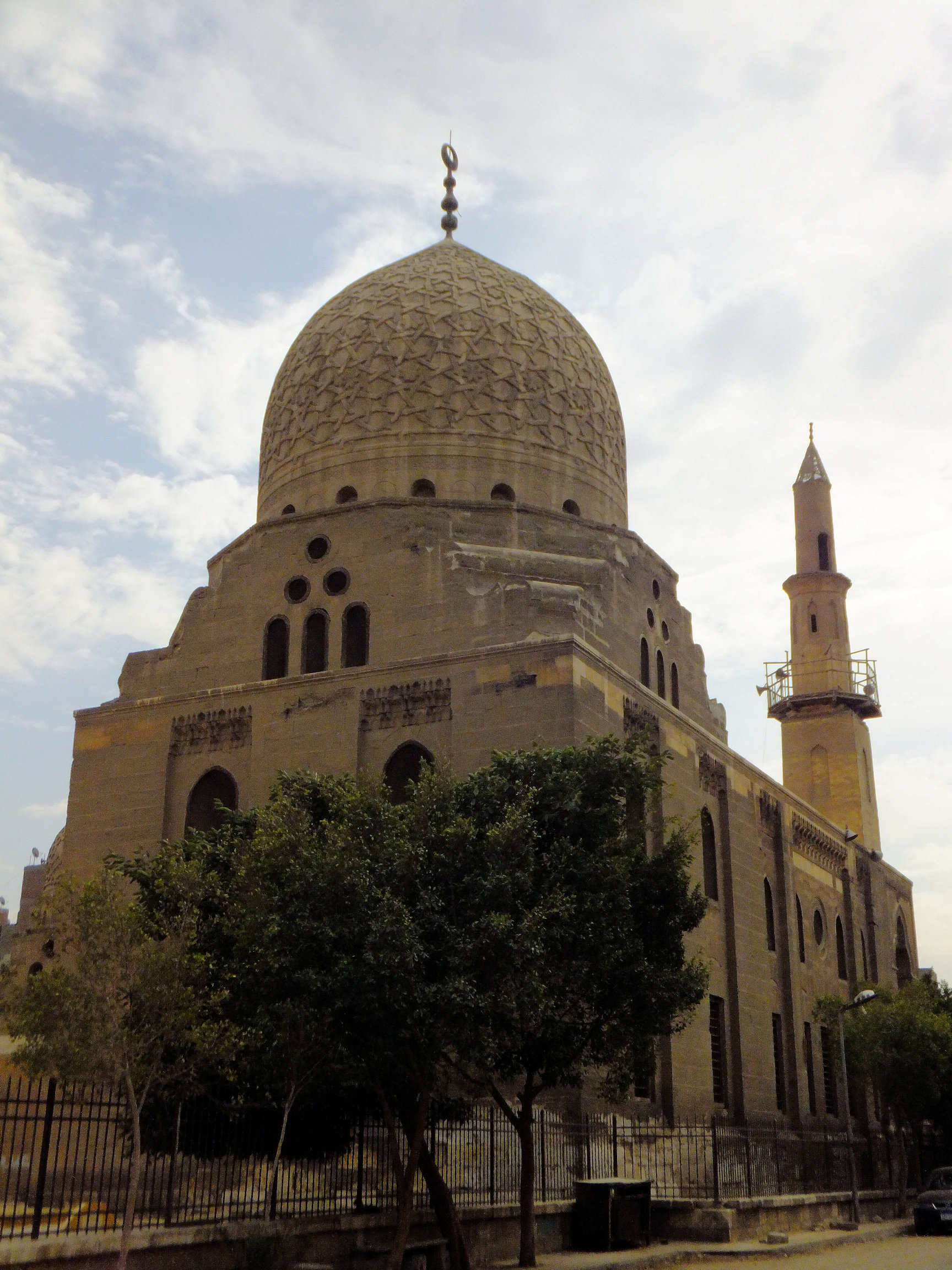

Religion
- Affiliation: Sunni Islam
- Ecclesiastical or organisational status: Mausoleum; Khanqah; Mosque
- Status: Active

Location
- Location: Northern Cemetery, Cairo
- Country: Egypt
- Interactive map of Khanqah-Mausoleum of Sultan Barsbay
- Coordinates: 30°2′51″N 31°16′38″E

Architecture
- Type: Islamic funerary complex
- Style: Mamluk
- Founder: Sultan al-Ashraf Barsbay
- Completed: 1432

Specifications
- Domes: 4: 1 – mausoleum; 1 – zawiya; 2 – other tombs
- Minaret: 1

The Khanqah and Mausoleum of Sultan Barsbay (Arabic: خانقاه الأشرف برسباي), also known as the Complex of Sultan Barsbay, is an Islamic funerary complex located in the historic Northern Cemetery of Cairo, Egypt. Built by Sultan al-Ashraf Barsbay in 1432, in addition to its overall layout and decoration, it is notable for the first stone domes in Cairo to be carved with geometric star patterns.

== History ==
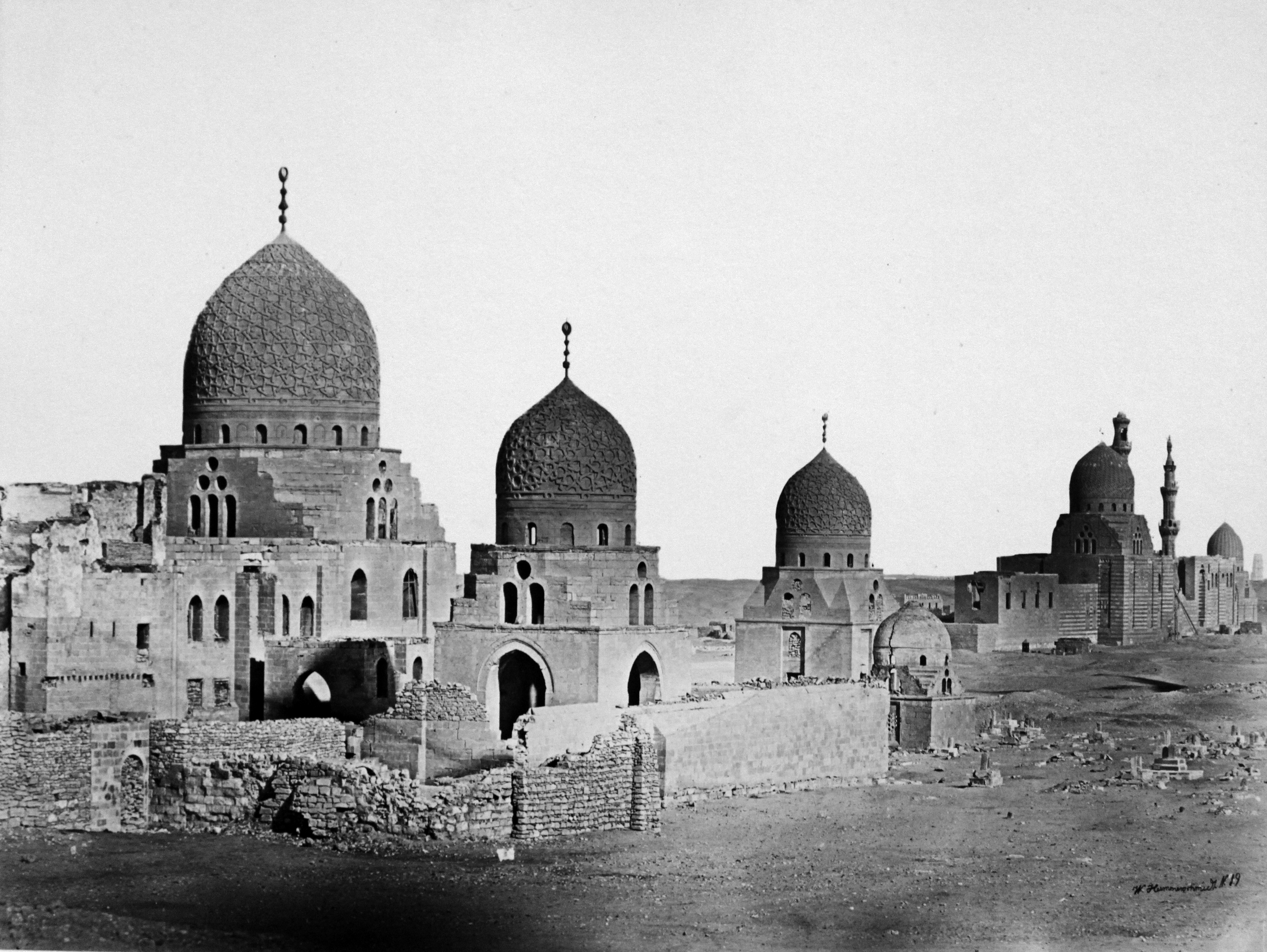
An 1860 photograph of the Mausoleum complex of Barsbay. From left to right: the dome of Barsbay's royal mausoleum, the tomb dome of a family member or amir, the Tomb of Gani Bak, and in the distance the Complex of Amir Qurqumas (and Sultan Inal)

Sultan al-Ashraf Sayf al-Din Barsbay ruled from 1422 to 1438 CE, a relatively long reign for the standards of the Mamluk period in Egypt. During that time, he built at least three notable buildings: the Madrasa of Barsbay, built in 1423–1424 (near the beginning of his reign) on al-Muizz Street; his mausoleum complex in the Northern Cemetery, described on this page; and a Friday mosque in the town of al-Khanqa, north of Cairo, in 1437.

He apparently had a reputation simultaneously for being greedy and bad-tempered but also for being generous to the poor and to Sufis (the latter tendency being evident in this mausoleum and khanqah complex). His reign was marked by relative security and stability, with few wars or rebellions. However, in 1427 he invaded Cyprus, captured its king (from the House of Lusignan) and forced him to pay tribute. He also diverted the Indian Ocean trade routes through Jeddah (closer to Cairo) and introduced a state monopoly on sugar and pepper. The revenues from this military victory and these trade policies may have helped him finance his construction projects, and may have encouraged him to build this new mausoleum complex in the Northern Cemetery later in his reign (after having already built a madrasa with attached mausoleum in the city center, mentioned above).

When Barsbay built this mausoleum and khanqah complex, Faraj ibn Barquq's own nearby khanqah and mausoleum had already been completed a couple decades earlier and a north-to-south road (still present today) had developed between here and the Citadel. Barsbay's own complex was clearly designed around this road, and features elements on both sides of it. His complex was completed in 1432.

== Architecture ==
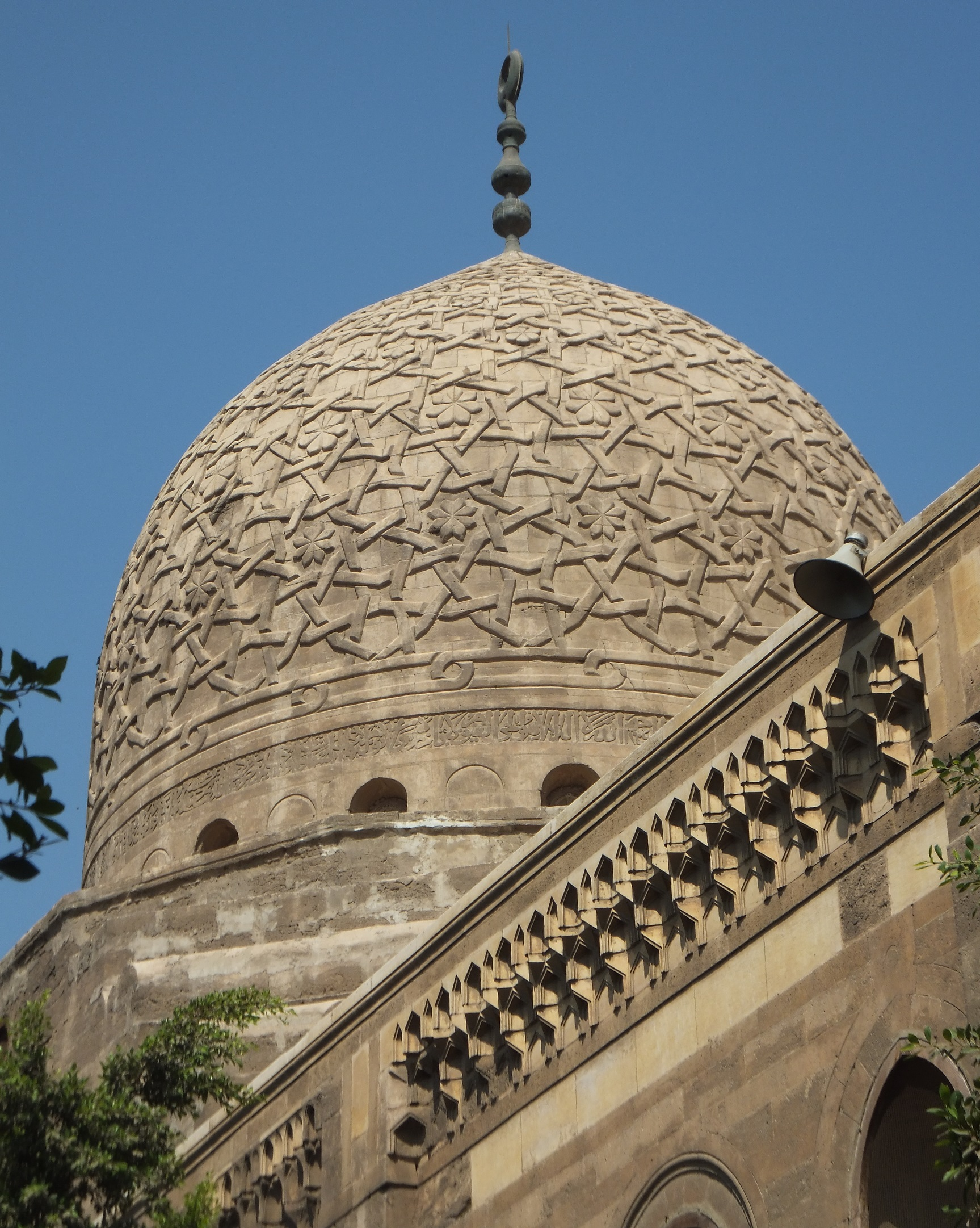
The stone dome of Barsbay's mausoleum, one of the first to incorporate an interlacing geometric pattern carved across its surface

=== Mosque and mausoleum ===
This funerary complex includes Barsbay's own royal mausoleum, to which is attached a mosque and prayer hall to the south which is accessed from the street through an entrance portal and vestibule. To the right of the entrance are also two sabils. The minaret on the exterior of the mosque appears to be a crude reconstruction from a later period and does not correspond to the Mamluk architectural style.

==== Prayer hall ====
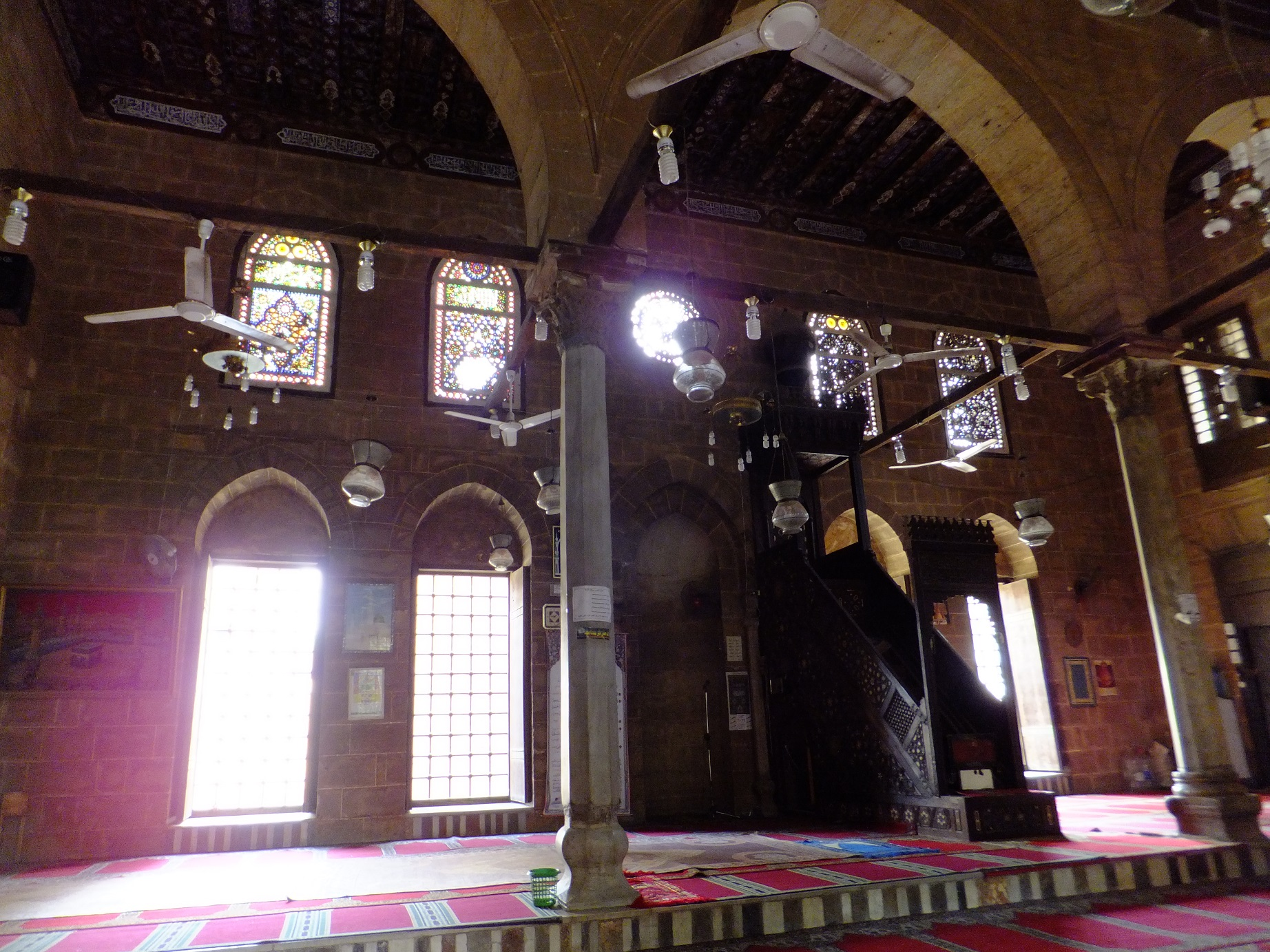
The mosque interior

The mosque measures approximately 15 by 20 metres (49 by 66 ft), and its longer side is aligned with the road. The interior of the mosque is split into three aisles (running parallel to the street), of which the central one is sunken or lower in relation to the others. The aisles are separated from each other by rows of three arches resting on columns with classical capitals (presumably Roman or Byzantine). The interior's most remarkable feature is the rich and varied multi-coloured marble mosaic pavement which covers the floors (although often obscured under the mosque's carpeting) and even appears on the windowsills. By contrast, the walls and the mihrab (niche symbolizing the qibla) are very plain; something seemingly common to Sufi khanqahs but not to regular mosques of the time. The mosque interior receives much light compared to other mosques of the period thanks to the structure's layout and its many windows, which include modern stucco windows carved in traditional patterns. The mosque's painted ceiling is also a later restoration.

===== Minbar =====
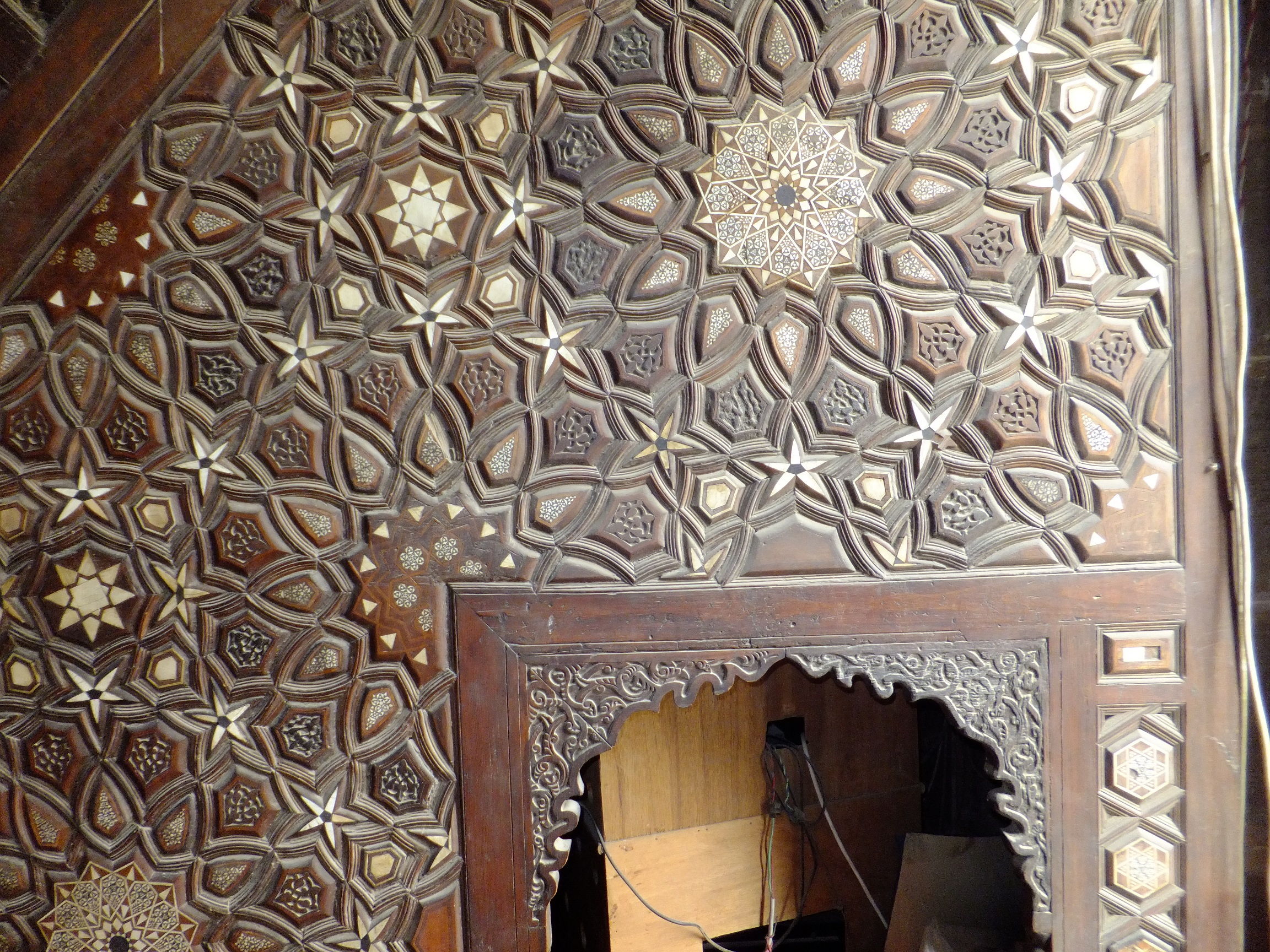
Details of the mosque's minbar, made of wood and inlaid with ivory; the minbar originally belonged to the Mosque of al-Ghamri (1451)

The mosque today also contains a minbar that is sometimes cited as the most beautiful and accomplished work of its kind in Cairo. Like most Mamluk minbars of the period it is made of wood and inlaid with ivory across a surface decorated with complex geometric star patterns. One detail that differs from other minbars of this type is that the geometric patterns have slightly curved lines instead of straight lines, subtly enhancing their visual effect. The minbar originally belonged to the Mosque of al-Ghamri which was built in 1451 in the Bab al-Shari'a area of Cairo. It was moved to Barsbay's mosque when al-Ghamri's mosque was demolished in 1884. The craftsman of the minbar is known from historical sources and is named as Ahmad ibn 'Isa al-Dimyati, who was also responsible for constructing minbars for the Mosque of Mecca and the later Mosque of Qijmas al-Ishaqi. The construction of the minbar was originally financed by a merchant and scholar named Ibn al-Radadi.

==== Mausoleum and dome ====
Barsbay's mausoleum is accessed through the mosque. The interior of the mausoleum, unlike the interior of the mosque, has a mihrab and walls that are lavishly decorated with marble paneling and mosaics inlaid with mother-of-pearl, as are the floor and the sultan's cenotaph/tomb. Just below the dome, the pendentives of the chamber (the transition between the square chamber and the round base of the dome) are sculpted with muqarnas, as was common in Mamluk architecture.

The exterior of the stone dome of the mausoleum is carved with a remarkable interlacing geometric star pattern. Along with some of the adjacent tombs in this mausoleum complex (see below), this is the first example of such a geometric pattern carved into the stone domes of Cairo or of Mamluk architecture, marking an important evolution from the earlier, simpler "chevron" or zig-zag patterns found on the nearby Mausoleums of Faraj ibn Barquq or on the dome of Barsbay's own earlier Madrasa-Mausoleum in the center of Cairo. The arrangement of the mausoleum at the northern end of the mosque, standing next to the street and unencumbered by any other architectural elements on three sides, allowed it to be both highly visible from the road as well as accessible to Muslims inside the mosque who could offer prayers to the Sultan's tomb; both important considerations in Mamluk funerary architecture.

=== Other structures ===
==== Khanqah ====
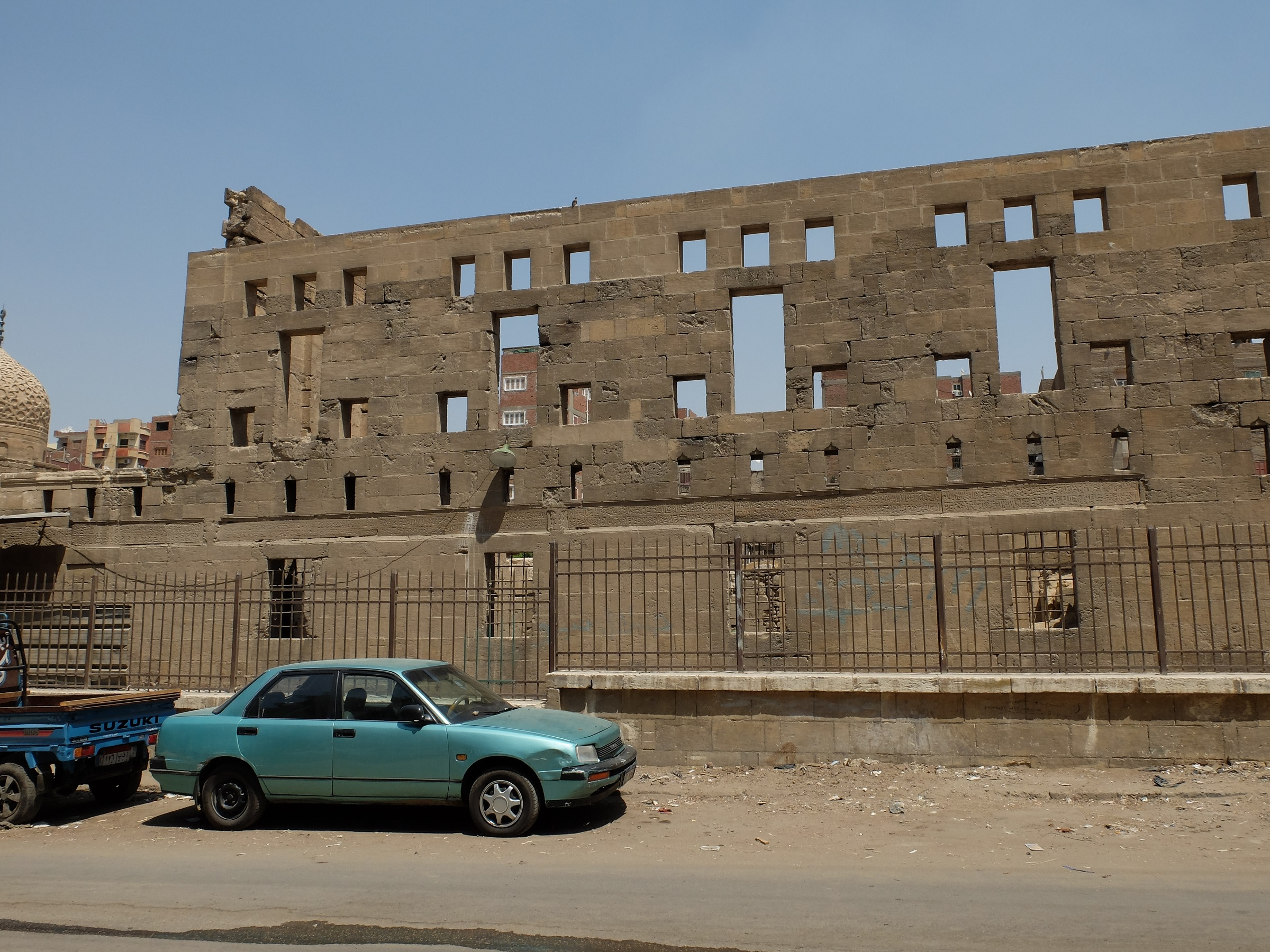
Remains of the khanqah and its lodgings for the Sufi residents

Further south, extending from the mosque and mausoleum but now ruined, is a long structure that acted as part of the khanqah and included living cells for the Sufi residents.

Further to the south of the khanqah, on the same side of the street, is another long, semi-ruined building that was once the Takiyya (another type of khanqah) of Ahmad Abu Sayf, also built in the 15th century but not part of Barsbay's original complex.

==== Other tombs ====
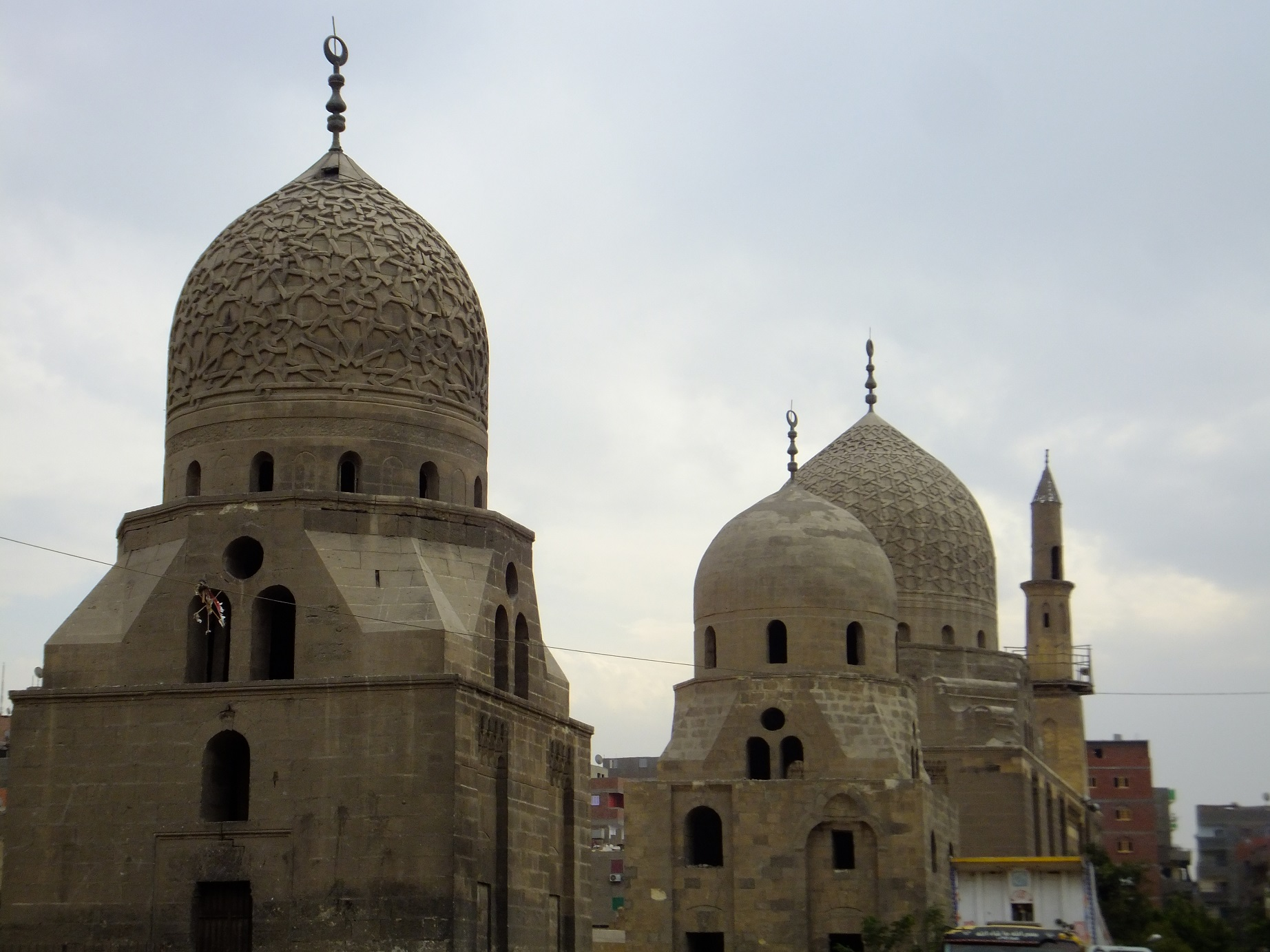
From left to right: the Tomb of Gani Bak, the Tomb of Qurqumas, and the Mausoleum dome of Sultan Barsbay

On the eastern side of these main structures is a musalla (open area for Islamic funerals), and all around this is a cemetery with tombs and several smaller mausoleums belonging to Barsbay's family members and favourite amirs.

Two domed mausoleums stand behind the mosque, to the east. The one closest to the mosque has lost its dome and may have been dedicated to Barsbay's parents. The one a little further away, now standing against the eastern wall of the cemetery, consists of a dome raised on top of a structure with open arches and is dedicated to Barsbay's brother Yashbak.

The dome of the tomb furthest to the north belongs to an amir called Gani Bak al-Ashrafi, who built his own madrasa complex in the city but who was beloved of Barsbay and buried here instead. (Note: Behren-Abouseif identifies him as an amir named Yashbak, who was the namesake of Barsbay's brother Yashbak; whereas Williams identifies him as Gani Bak and offers more detail. It's unclear if these are merely different names attributed to the same amir or if the two authors are contradicting each other and referring to different individuals.) According to one author, his tomb is dated to 1427 (earlier than the main complex built in 1432). However, another analysis proposes that it was either built after Barsbay's main dome or that the carved pattern on its dome was executed later, judging by the increased sophistication of the geometric patterns and their arguably better adaption to the curved surface of the dome. The dome of Yasbhbak's tomb (mentioned above) may also be one of the earliest domes carved in this way.

Between Barbsay's mausoleum and Gani Bak's tomb stands another tomb (distinguished by its plain dome) which belongs to a Mamluk named Qurqumas (not the same Qurqumas who built his monumental complex further north). It was originally built in 1511 in front of al-Hakim's Mosque on al-Muizz Street, but was moved here when that mosque was restored in the 20th century.

==== Zawiya and other structures to the west side ====
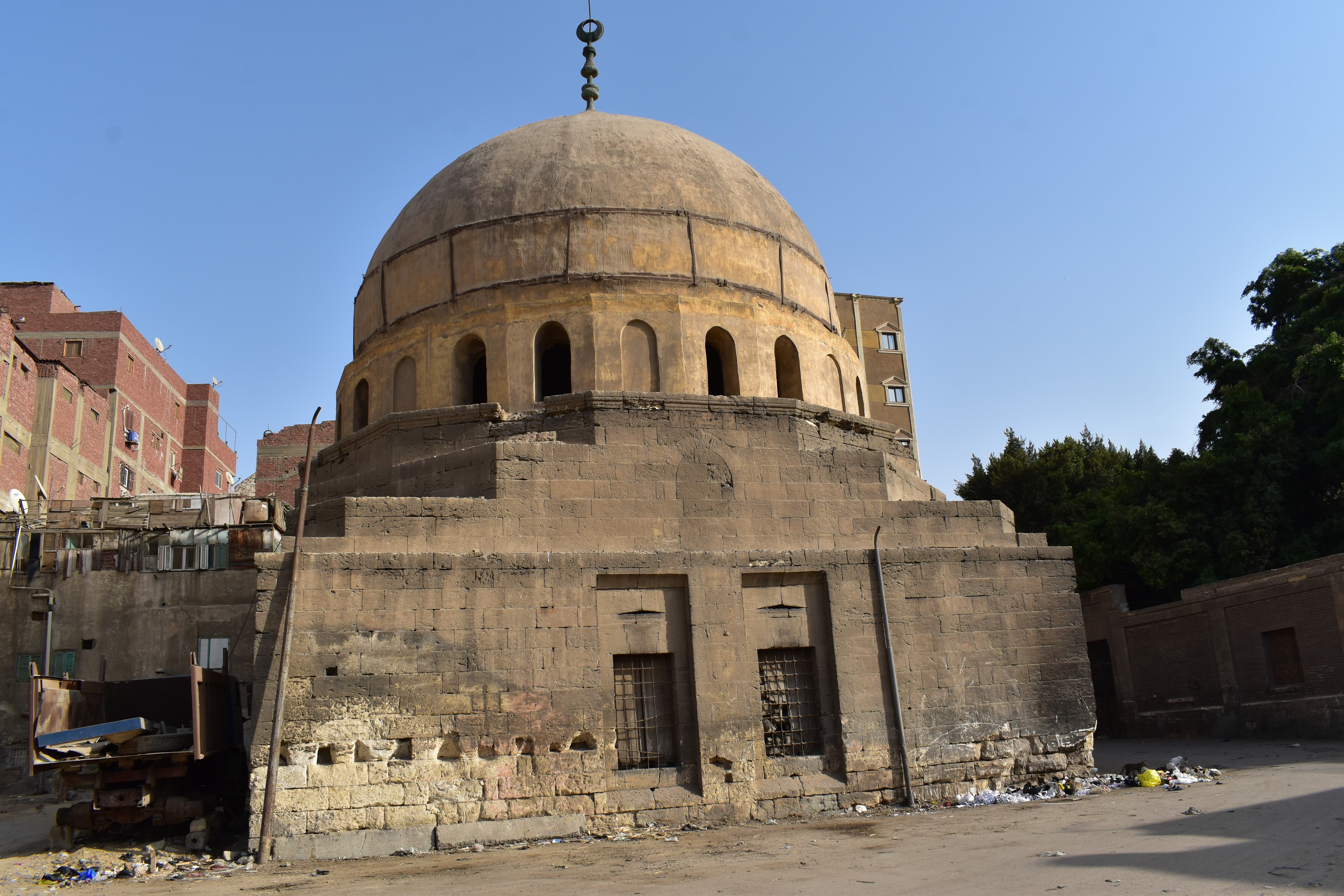
The dome of the zawiya of Barsbay's complex, which was devoted to Sufis of the al-Rifa'i order

To the west, across the street from the mosque and mausoleum, was once a zawiya consisting of a domed chamber and a hospice for Sufi travelers. Only the domed structure remains today, which is sometimes identified as the Qubba al-Rifa'i ("Dome/tomb of al-Rifa'i", referring to the founder of the Sufi order to which the zawiya was dedicated). It was likely used as an oratory or ceremonial hall where Sufi ceremonies such as the dhikr were performed. The interior of the dome chamber was probably redecorated in the 19th century, featuring scallop-shell carving in the triple-niche pendentives, as well as other plasterwork.

Further south from here, on the same side of the street but surrounded by modern buildings, is an anonymous tomb which is thought to belong to Barsbay's mother, known as Khadija Umm al-Ashraf, possibly dating to 1440.

== Function ==
While the focus of the complex was the sultan's mausoleum, the attached structures were designed to offer services to a small group of Sufis, a function that was common to many Mamluk funerary establishments in Cairo's cemeteries. The khanqah was devoted to serving 17 Sufis and their leader. The Sufis were from the al-Rifa'i order, which was popular with the common people. The mosque was also listed in the waqf document as a madrasa for teaching 4 Sufi students in Islamic law within the framework of the Hanafi madhhab.

== See also ==
- Islam in Egypt
- List of mausoleums in Cairo
- List of mosques in Cairo
- Late medieval domes
