= Barsbay =

Sultan of Egypt and Syria (r. 1422–1438)

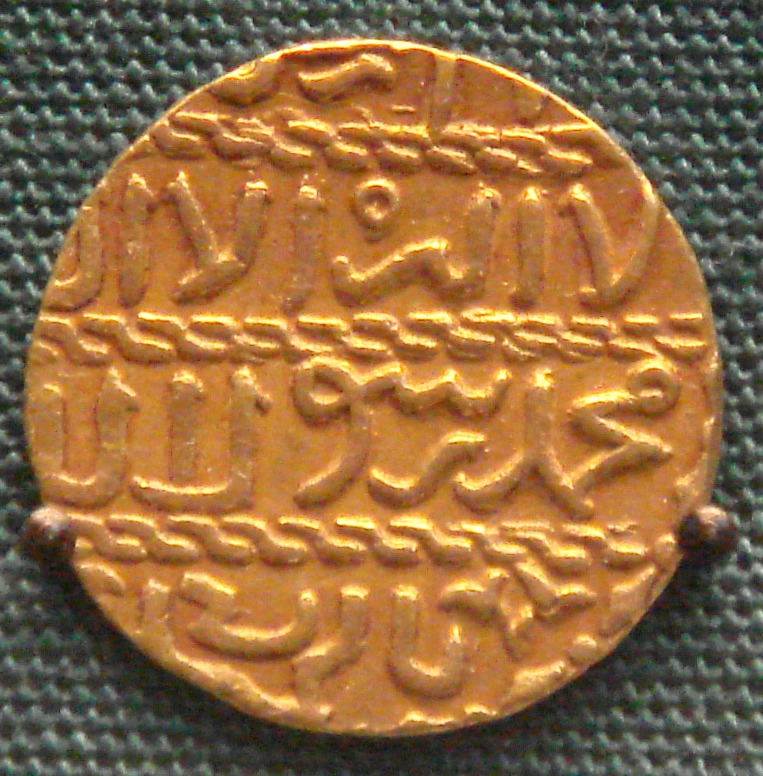
- Gold ashrafi of Barsbay (1422–1438), British Museum.

Sultan of Egypt and Syria
- Reign: 1422 – 1438
- Predecessor: An-Nasir ad-Din Muhammad
- Successor: Al-Aziz Jamal ad-Din Yusuf
- Born: c. 1369
- Died: 7 June 1438 (aged c. 69); Cairo, Egypt
- Spouse: Khawand Fatima; Khawand Fatima; Khawand Julban; Khawand Shahzada; Malikbay
- Issue: Muhammad; Al-Aziz Jamal ad-Din Yusuf; Ahmed
Regnal name
- Al-Sultan al-Malik al-Ashraf Sayf al-Din Abu'l Nasr Barsbay

Al-Ashraf Sayf ad-Dīn Barsbāy (Arabic: الأشرف سيف الدين برسباي) was the ninth Burji Mamluk sultan of Egypt from AD 1422 to 1438. He was Circassian by birth and a former slave of the first Burji Sultan, Barquq.

== Early career ==
A former slave of the inaugural Burjite sultan, Barquq, Barsbay hailed from Circassian descent. On May 2, 1418, he was designated as the governor of Tripoli. He later assumed the role of tutor to Muhammad, the son of Sultan Tatar, who was just ten years old upon ascending to the throne. Afterward, conflict broke out among three groups of emirs, one supporting the Sultan's Mamluks, while emirs Barsbay and Taribay opposed him. Barsbay and Taribay swiftly gained control, with Barsbay becoming regent and Taribay the military commander-in-chief.

Despite quelling a revolt by the Viceroy of Aleppo and imprisoning several emirs, tension between Barsbay and Taribay escalated, resulting in Barsbay's victory. Taribay was captured and imprisoned in Alexandria, allowing Barsbay to pursue the throne. With backing from the Viceroy of Damascus and other emirs, Barsbay deposed Sultan Muhammad just two days later, on April 1, 1422.

== Reign ==
Barsbay's 16-year reign was a relatively long reign by the standards of the Mamluk period in Egypt. His reign was marked by relative security and stability, with few wars or rebellions. He apparently had a reputation simultaneously for being greedy and bad-tempered but also generous to the poor and to Sufis (the latter tendency being evident in his mausoleum-khanqah complex in the Northern Cemetery).

He was responsible for a number of administrative reforms in the Mamluk state, including the consolidation of the sultanate as a military magistrature and securing for Egypt exclusive rights over the Red Sea trade between Yemen and Europe. In the process, he diverted the Indian Ocean trade routes through Jeddah (closer to Cairo) and also introduced a state monopoly on sugar and pepper. His Red Sea activity included the final destruction in 1426 of ‘Aydhab, a once important port which had been in decline in the previous century.

The 15th century saw an international economic recession. During this time, Barsbay knew the importance of trade for Egypt and acted to strengthen Egyptian rule in the Hejaz and Yemen while securing Egyptian trade in the Mediterranean Sea. He reduced customs duties to attract merchants until Egypt became a monopoly of most trade in the East, angering some European powers at the time. He gained the title of the "Merchant Sultan" (السلطان التاجر).

In 1424–26, he invaded and conquered Cyprus, captured its king Janus of Cyprus (from the House of Lusignan) and forced him to pay tribute.

In 1430, Egypt was severely struck by famine and plague.

Barsbay had good ties with other Muslim rulers of his time, namely Jalaluddin Muhammad Shah, the Sultan of Bengal. According to Al-Sakhawi's Al-Daw' al-Lāmi` li-Ahl al-Qarn al-Tāsi', the Mamluk sultan once gifted the Bengali sultan with investiture, a robe of honour and a letter of recognition. The Bengali ruler had died before his gifts could be dispatched to Barsbay. His son and successor, Shamsuddin Ahmad Shah, had slightly delayed the dispatching but nevertheless sending the initial gifts of his father off whilst also adding more gifts of his own. In total, the package was worth over 12,000 red tankas and included clothes, cotton, ginger, myrobalan and other spices. The envoy, travelling from Bengal to Cairo via the Indian Ocean, sank whilst at Jeddah's coast. In 1436, the Governor of Jeddah sent some men to search the Red Sea for the gifts and they came back with the textiles although the spices were damaged by the water. After Barsbay was informed of this by the governor, he ordered for the arrest of all members of the Bengali embassy, the confiscation of their envoy's merchandise, and banned them from ever travelling to Cairo again.

The revenues from this military victory and these trade policies may have helped him finance his construction projects, and he is known for at least three extant and notable monuments. He built a madrasa-mosque complex in the heart of Cairo on al-Muizz street in 1424. His mausoleum complex, which also included a madrasa and khanqah, was built in Cairo's Northern Cemetery in 1432. He also built a mosque in the town of al-Khanqa, north of Cairo, in 1437.

== Family ==
Barsbay's first wife was Khawand Fatima, the daughter Qajqar al-Qardami. She was the mother of his son Muhammad. She died on 15 May 1424. Abbasid caliph Al-Mu'tadid II and the qadis were involved in her funerary prayer. She was buried at the qubba of Barsbay's madrasa. Another of his wives was Khawand Fatima, the daughter of Sultan Sayf ad-Din Tatar. Her mother was the daughter of Qutlubugha Hajji al-Banaqusi al-Turkmani al-Halabi. She had previously been married to Amir Yashbak. She died on 30 August 1469, and was buried with her father. Another wife was Khawand Jolban, daughter of Yashbak Tatar, a Circassian. She had been a concubine, and was his favourite wife. Barsbay married her after she gave birth to their son Al-Aziz Jamal ad-Din Yusuf on 14 April 1424. She died on 18 April 1436, after a long illness, and was buried in the tomb mosque of Barsbay. Another wife was the widow of his master, Amir Duqmaq. Another wife was Khawand Shahzada. She was the daughter of Ottoman Prince Orhan Çelebi, son of Süleyman Çelebi, who was himself the son of Sultan Bayezid I. She had a younger brother named Süleyman Çelebi. They married in 1537. After Barsbay's death, she married Sultan Sayf ad-Din Jaqmaq. One of his concubines was Malikbay. She was a Circassian, and was the mother of his son Ahmed (1438 – 1463). After Barsbay's death, she married Qurkmas al-Ashrafi al-Jalab. She died in 1456.

== See also ==
- Al-Ashraf Mosque

== Sources ==
- D. Behrens-Abouseif, Islamic architecture in Cairo: an introduction (Leiden, 1989).
- J.-C. Garcin, "The regime of the Circassian Mamluks," in C. Petry, ed., The Cambridge History of Egypt, Volume I: Islamic Egypt, 640-1517 (Cambridge, 1998), 290-317.
- Muir, W. (1896). The Mameluke; or, Slave dynasty of Egypt, 1260-1517, A. D. Smith, Elder. pp. 137−148.
- Ibn Taghribirdi (1929). Al-Nujūm al-Zāhirah fī Mulūk Miṣr wa-al-Qāhirah (in Arabic). Vol. 14. Egyptian Dar al-Kutub Press in Cairo.

Regnal titles
Preceded by An-Nasir ad-Din Muhammad	Mamluk Sultan of Egypt; 1422–1438	Succeeded by Al-Aziz Jamal ad-Din Yusuf
