= Ibn bint al-Aqsarayi =

Egyptian Muslim scholar

Al-Sheikh al-Imam Ibn bint al-Aqsarayi
- ابن بنت الأقصرائي

Personal life
- Born: 1388 AD (790 AH) Cairo, Egyptian Mamluk Sultanate
- Died: 1455 (aged 66–67) AD (859 AH) Mecca, Egyptian Mamluk Sultanate
- Citizenship: Egyptian Mamluk Sultanate
- Era: Mamluk era (Islamic Golden Age)
- Main interest(s): Tafsir, Fiqh, Hadith
- Occupation: Faqih, Mufassir, Muhaddith, military soldier

Religious life
- Religion: Islam
- School: Hanafi
- Creed: Sunni

Military service
- Allegiance: Egyptian Mamluk Sultanate
- Service/branch: Egyptian army
- Battles/wars: Mamluk campaigns against Cyprus

Mohib al-Din Abu al-Sa'adat Mahammad ibn Ahmad ibn Abi Yazid al-Sarayi al-Qahiri al-Hanafi known as Ibn bint al-Aqsarayi (Egyptian Arabic: محب الدين أبو السعادات محمد ابن أحمد ابن أبي يزيد السرائي القاهري الحنفي; 1388 – 1455) was an Egyptian Muslim scholar of the ninth century AH/fifteenth century AD who lived in the Burji Mamluk era. He was born, raised and educated in Cairo. Among his sheikhs are 'Izz al-Din ibn Jama'ah and Shams al-Din al-Bisati. He was a Hanafi faqih, muhaddith, mufassir, and teacher. He traveled to Alexandria, Damascus, Aleppo, Jerusalem, and Amid. Among his works are footnotes on Al-Kashshaf and on Al-Hidaya, which he collected from five commentaries that were not completed. He died in Mecca.

== Life ==
He is Mahammad ibn Ahmad ibn Abi Yazid ibn Mahammad, Muhib al-Din, Abu al-Sa'adat al-Sarayi (named after a city in the country of al-Dust بلاد الدست), of Ajami origin, al-Qahiri, and he is known as Ibn Bint al-Aqsarayi. He was born in Cairo on Dhu al-Hijjah 17 in the year 790 AH/1388 AD, and there he grew up under the sponsorship of his maternal grandfather because his father died when he was young. He learned and traveled to Alexandria, Damascus, Aleppo, Jerusalem, and Amid. He invaded with the Egyptian army to conquer the island of Cyprus in the year 828 AH. He performed Hajj many times and taught tafsir (interpretation) in al-Mudiya. Among his sheikhs are 'Izz al-Din ibn Jama’ah, al-Bisati, and others, and among his students are al-Sakhawi, his uncles, and others. He was a Hanafi faqih, muhaddith, and mufassir. He died in Mecca in 859 AH/1455 AD.

== Works ==
- A footnote to al-Kashshaf in tafsir, in which he collected what he saw from the footnotes of al-Tibi, al-Jarbardi, al-Qutb, al-Taftazani, Akmal al-Din, I'rab al-Samin and others, reconciling the apparent differences in their words and reaching the end of Surah An-Nisa.
- A footnote to al-Hidaya
