= Hund Şehzade =

Ottoman princess (1422–1455)

- Born: Fatma Şahzade Hatun; 1422
- Died: July 1455 (aged 32–33); Cairo, Mamluk Sultanate
- Spouse: Barsbay; Sayf ad-Din Jaqmaq; Barsbay Bujashi
- Issue: second marriage Ahmed; Other three sons
- House: Ottoman (by birth); Burji (by marriage)
- Father: Orhan Çelebi
- Religion: Sunni Islam

Hund Şehzade (Ottoman Turkish: خوند شاهزادہ; born Fatma Şahzade Hatun and known also as Khawand Shahzada; 1422 – July 1455) was an Ottoman princess, granddaughter of claimant to the throne Süleyman Çelebi, and great-granddaughter of Sultan Bayezid I (r.1389 – 1402) of the Ottoman Empire. She was wife of Barsbay, and later of Sayf ad-Din Jaqmaq, Egypt Sultans of the Burji dynasty.

== Early life ==
Born in 1422 as Fatma Şahzade Hatun, she was a daughter of Orhan Çelebi, son of Süleyman Çelebi, who was himself the son of Sultan Bayezid I. She had two older brothers, Orhan and Mehmed, an older sister, Melek, and a younger brother, Süleyman (1423 – 1437).

In 1433, Şahzade and her brother Süleyman took refuge in Cairo. The Mamluk Sultan Barsbay treated them generously, and rejected her cousin Murad II's requests to surrender them.

== Life ==
=== First marriage ===
In 1436, Ibrahim II of Karaman, attacked the Dulkadirids, and captured the disputed town of Kayseri and other fortresses in its vicinity. However, the Dulkadirids retook Kayseri and the surrounding countryside from the Karamanids in December 1436 with Ottoman help. Upon receiving this news Barsbay in March 1437, assembled his advisory council, and decided to send the governors of Syria to help Ibrahim Bey. However, before the crisis escalated, and turned into a military clash, both Ottoman and Mamluk Sultans settled their differences two months later in May. A peace agreement was settled, with Barsbay's marriage to Şehzade.

=== Second marriage ===
After Barsbay's death in 1438, his successor Sultan Sayf-al-Din Jaqmaq married Şehzade, in order to consolidate good relations with the Ottomans. On 5 January 1447, she made a pilgrimage with the dowry she received at the time of her marriage to Jaqmaq.

The two together had four sons. All of them died of plague at Cairo on 26 March 1449. The eldest one named Ahmed being seven years old. Jaqmaq divorced her on 25 December 1450.

=== Third marriage ===
After Jaqmaq divorced Şehzade, she settled in a house in al-Jawdariyya, and married Sahib-al-Hujjab Barsbay Bujashi.

== Death ==
Şehzade died in July 1455 in Cairo.

== Sources ==
- Belleten, Volume 17, Issues 65-68. Türk Tarih Kurumu Basımevi. 1953.
- Shai Har-El (1995). Struggle for Domination in the Middle East: The Ottoman-Mamluk War, 1485-91. BRILL. ISBN 978-9-004-10180-7.
