= Mamluk campaigns against Cyprus (1424–1426) =

Series of Egyptian military expeditions, 1424 to 1426

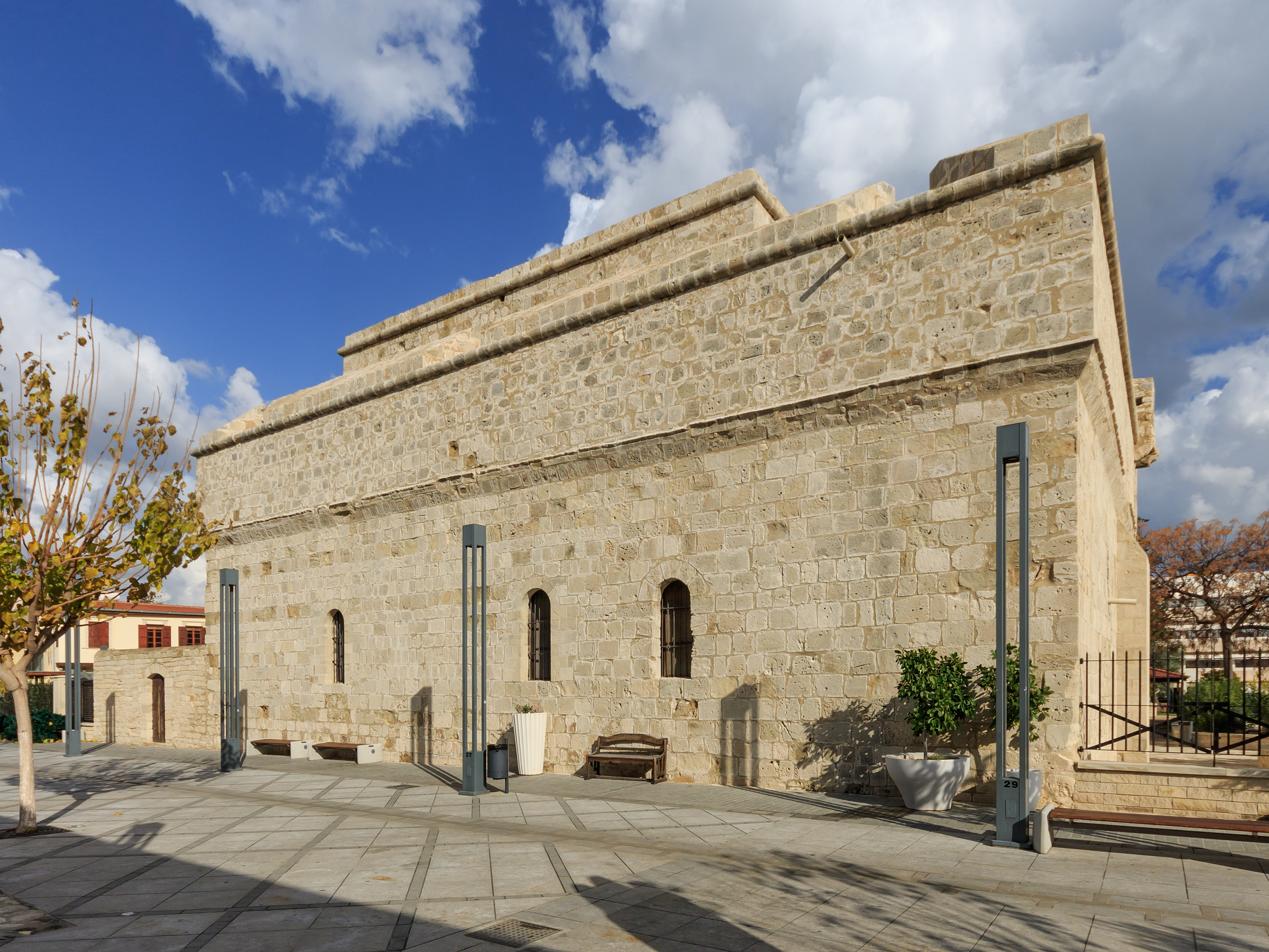
- Limassol Castle suffered damages due to attacks of Mamluks
Date	1424–1426
Location	Cyprus
Result	Mamluk victory: Cyprus became a tributary state

Belligerents
Kingdom of Cyprus	Mamluk Sultanate

Commanders and leaders
Janus, King of Cyprus (POW)	Barsbay; Ibn bint al-Aqsarayi

Strength
First campaign 370 men and 6 ships. Second campaign 11 or 12 ships. Third campaign unknown at Chirokitia, 14 ships.	First campaign 4 or 5 ships. Second campaign 40 ships. Third campaign 100 ships.

The Mamluk campaigns against Cyprus were a series of military expeditions launched by the Mamluk Sultanate into the Kingdom of Cyprus between 1424 and 1426. As a result of the Mamluk victory in the battle of Khirokitia on 7 July 1426 and the capture of King Janus, Cyprus became a tributary state to the Egyptians.

== Background ==
In 1191, Richard I of England captured the island of Cyprus from the Byzantines during the Third Crusade, the island was later sold to Guy of Lusignan who purchased Cyprus from the Templars in 1192, who had themselves purchased it from Richard. Cyprus served as a supplier to the Levantine crusaders, in 1271, Baybars attempted to capture the island with an armada of 17 ships, but it was wrecked and destroyed in Limassol.

Cyprus later became a base for Frankish pirates and raiders, in late 1292, Cypriots kidnapped Egyptian sailors in the Mediterranean Sea. The Egyptian Sultan El-Ashraf Khalil bin Qalawun, who was known for his extreme pride and temper, immediately ordered 100 huge warships to be built and prepared to invade all of Cyprus. He preferred to follow the construction of these ships himself, butwas assassinated in 1293 before the campaign was launched. In 1365, Peter I of Cyprus launched a raid into Alexandria and sacked the city over 3 days, killing its inhabitants and looting lots of treasures.

Raids continued later on, in August 1422, the Cypriots captured a ship in the port of Alexandria and in May 1424, they seized two ships from Damietta.

== Campaigns ==
=== First campaign ===
In late September 1424, the Mamluk armada consisting of 4 or 5 ships landed near Limassol. The garrison knew about the incoming raid and evacuated the inhabitants before their arrival, leaving only 300 men and 70 knights, led by the Bailli and reinforcements from Nicosia led by Philip Prevost. The Mamluks attacked Limassol, defeated its garrison, killed Prevost, and sacked and burned the city. They also burned 3 ships and sank 3 others, capturing 23 men.

=== Second campaign ===
In July 1425, the Mamluks launched an organized raid with an armada of 40 ships. The fleet arrived south of Famagusta where the governor pledged allegiance to the Sultan and showed hospitality. The Mamluks then raided the countryside, sacking everything in their way. They marched to Larnaca, where they met the Cypriot fleet of 11 or 12 ships led by Janus's brother; defeating it. The invaders again sacked Limassol, killed many of its inhabitants and departed in August. The number of slaves captured was apparently around 1,060 people and it is said that it took 70 camels to collect the looted treasure.

=== Third campaign ===
On this occasion the Mamluks aimed to subjugate the entire island, preparing a fleet of 100 ships. Their fleet attacked Limassol for the third time on 1 July 1426, destroying the castle. The Mamluks spent 6 days ravaging everything in their way until they met Janus's army in the fields of Khirokitia on 7 July. The Cypriot army was routed and King Janus was captured in battle. They then moved to capture Nicosia, however, learning of a naval reinforcement of 14 ships, the Mamluk marched to meet them and in the ensuing battle killed 1,500 crusaders and then went on to capture Nicosia, sacking a part of the city. On 18 July 1426, the Mamluks embarked for home.

== Aftermath ==
When news reached Cairo, it was celebrated in the city, and festivals were held, the people welcomed the Egyptians from their campaign. The looted treasure, and the prisoners, around 1000, were paraded in the march, including Janus himself, envoys from Ottoman Empire, Hafsid dynasty and Sharif of Mecca praised Barsbay for his victory, Janus was then brought to the Sultan, humiliated, he was forced to pay a 200,000 dinar ransom and agree to an annual tribute.
