= Al-Ashraf Mosque =

Mosque in Cairo, Egypt

Al-Ashraf Mosque Mosque-Madrasa of Al-Ashraf Barsbay
- مسجد ومدرسة الأشرف برسباي
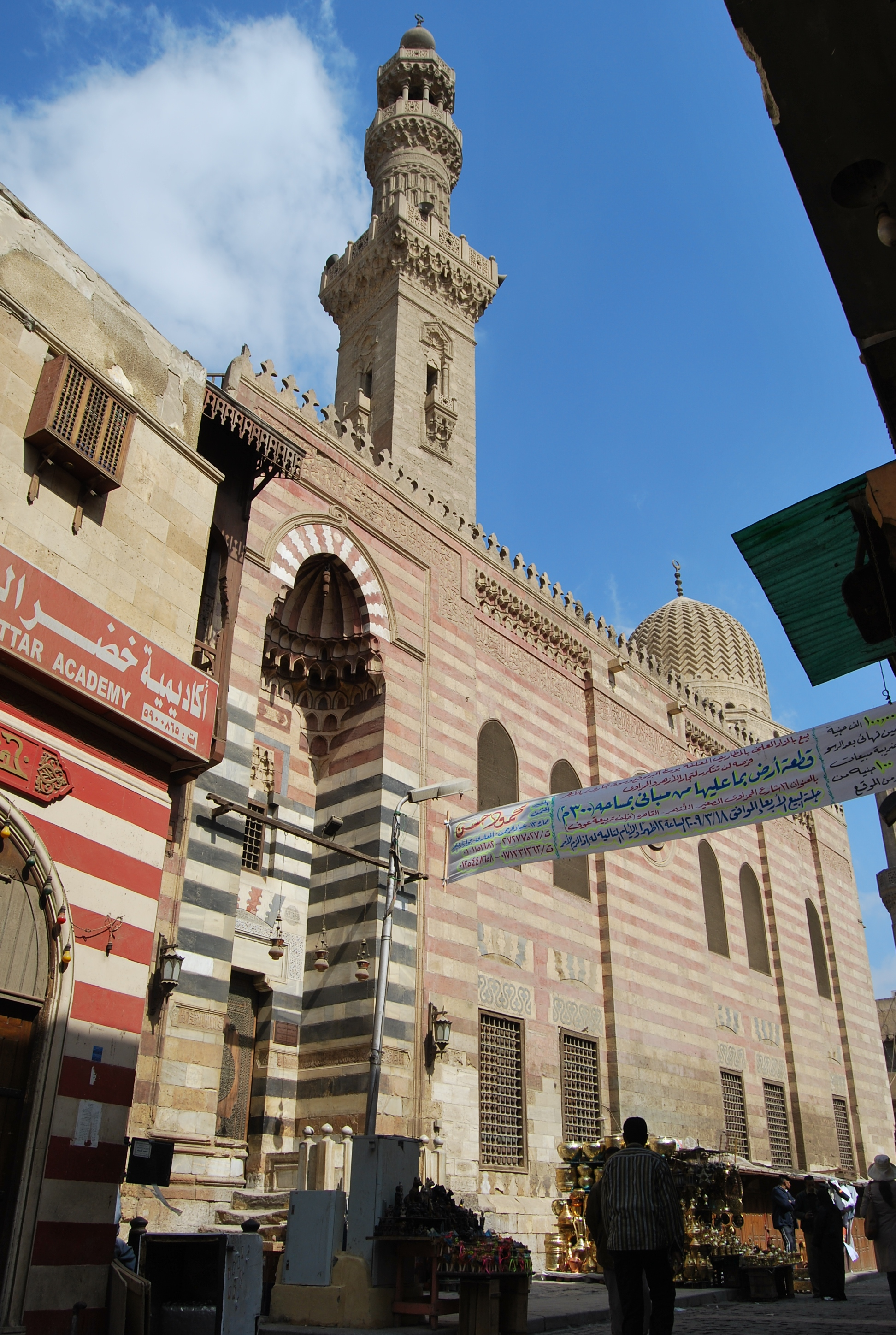

Religion
- Affiliation: Sunni Islam
- Sect: Sufism
- Ecclesiastical or organisational status: Mosque; Madrasa; Mausoleum; Khanqah
- Status: Active

Location
- Location: Muizz Street, Islamic Cairo
- Country: Egypt
- Interactive map of Al-Ashraf Mosque; Mosque-Madrasa of Al-Ashraf Barsbay
- Coordinates: 30°02′51″N 31°15′28″E

Architecture
- Type: Islamic funerary complex
- Style: Islamic; Mamluk
- Founder: Sultan Al-Ashraf Al-Barsbay
- Completed: 826 AH (1422/1423 CE)
- Materials: Marble; stained glass

The Al-Ashraf Mosque, also known as the Mosque-Madrasa of Sultan al-Ashraf Barsbay (Arabic: مسجد ومدرسة الأشرف برسباي), is an Islamic religious funerary complex that contains a mosque, madrasa, mausoleum, and khanqah, located on Muizz Street in Islamic Cairo, Egypt. The mosque was built during the Mamluk period by the Burji Sultan Al-Ashraf Al-Barsbay. The mosque is characterized by its design, which incorporates marble and stained-glass windows.

== Background ==
The mosque complex was built by Barsbay, the Circassian sultan who ruled the Mamluk Empire from 825 AH (1421/1422 CE) to 841 AH (1437/1438 CE). Barsbay's monopolistic trade policies, which included restrictions on luxury goods and fixed prices for spices like pepper, crippled his subjects and disrupted trade between Egypt and Europe. However, control of trade routes and taxes on religious minorities also enabled the Mamluks to fund the construction of many small to medium-sized buildings in Cairo, including the construction of relatively small mosques often containing madrasas and khanqahs. Barsbay, as a result, built various structures in Cairo and encouraged the use of madrasas and illuminated Qur'ans. He began construction on the Al-Ashraf Mosque in 826 AH (1422/1423 CE).

While Barsbay is best known for his economic failures and expansionism, including his conquest of Cyprus, medieval sources also present him as a pious man who invested in the building and restoration of religious buildings. This was typical of Mamluk rulers, who viewed themselves as guardians of the Islamic faith after re-establishing orthodox Sunnism as the dominant religious tradition in Egypt.

== Architecture ==
The Al-Ashraf Mosque is within the larger complex of Sultan Al-Ashraf Barsbay, consisting of two sabils, a mosque-madrasa, a mausoleum, and Sufi lodgings. The Sufi lodgings have since been destroyed, but originally were characterized by an elaborate dome. The dome in the sahn of the complex was an early example of a dome featuring a geometric carved surface.

The mosque is 20 by 15 metres (66 by 49 ft). The interior of the mosque consists of pavements made of marble mosaic, a center aisle with raised iwans on both sides, arcades with classical capitals, and two rows of windows. The southeast wall of the mosque is where the mihrab and minbar are located. The minbar is decorated while the mihrab is less ornamented in comparison to the other features of the mosque. The simpler mihrab during this period may have served as a reflection of the modesty of the Sufi brotherhoods. The tomb chamber is lit by unoriginal colored glass windows and is located on the north side of the mosque. Barsbay's cenotaph is located in front of the mihrab and is made of marble.

The Al-Ashraf Mosque maintains a pronounced regional identity due to the nature of the building craft and relative immobility of builders in comparison with other craftsmen – the visual exterior is tied to traditions and technique. The main inscription around the vaulted iwans is a rare example of a deed carved in stone, meant to serve as a perpetual reminder to the building's overseers how currency reserved for maintenance and personnel was to be spent. This feature points to a sense of transparency and communication between the Sultan and the people of Cairo.

== Function ==
The Al-Ashraf Mosque complex combines public space for prayer, areas for religious instruction, and a tomb dedicated to its patron. The religious complexes built by Mamluk Sultans doubled as expressions of power and magnificence, and as a means of giving back to the public.

Mamluk patronage of the arts focused on building monuments of piety that would be accessible to many people, rather than exclusive to the royal court. Despite the social barrier between the ruling establishment and the local population, Sultans were visible in their city and sought to encourage religion and Sufi worship. Mamluk rulers also gave dual meaning to these monuments by turning them into funerary memorials for themselves.

== See also ==
- Islam in Egypt
- List of madrasas in Egypt
- List of mausoleums in Egypt
- List of mosques in Cairo
