= Al-Muzaffar Ahmad =

Sultan of Egypt and Syria
- Reign: 13 January 1421 – 29 August 1421
- Predecessor: Shaykh al-Mahmudi
- Successor: Sayf ad-Din Tatar
- Born: 27 May 1419; Cairo
- Died: 1430 (aged 10–11); Alexandria
- Father: Shaykh al-Mahmudi
- Mother: Khawand Sa'adat

Al-Muzaffar Ahmad (Arabic: المظفر أحمد بن الشيخ; 27 May 1419 – 1430) was the son of Shaykh al-Mahmudi, and a Mamluk sultan of Egypt from 13 January to 29 August 1421.

== Biography ==
Al-Muzaffar Ahmad became sultan at 18 months old upon his father's death on January 13, 1421. Emir Sayf al-Din Tatar swiftly consolidated power and eventually dethroned the young sultan on August 29, 1421, marrying his mother, Princess Sa'adat, before divorcing her. Al-Muzaffar Ahmad and his brother Ibrahim were imprisoned in Alexandria, where they both died of the plague. They were initially buried in Alexandria but later moved to Cairo's tomb complex of their father.

== Sources ==
- Ibn Taghribirdi (1929). Al-Nujūm al-Zāhirah fī Mulūk Miṣr wa-al-Qāhirah (in Arabic). Vol. 14. Egyptian Dar al-Kutub Press in Cairo.

Regnal titles
Preceded by Shaykh al-Mahmudi	Mamluk Sultan of Egypt; 13 January 1421–29 August 1421	Succeeded by Sayf ad-Din Tatar
