= Al-Mansur Fakhr al-Din Uthman =

Sultan of Egypt and Syria
- Reign: 1 February − 15 March 1453
- Predecessor: Sayf al-Din Jaqmaq
- Successor: Sayf al-Din Inal
- Born: c. 1435
- Died: 1484; Damietta
- Father: Sayf al-Din Jaqmaq
- Mother: Khawand Zahra

Al-Malik al-Mansur Fakhr al-Din Uthman ibn Jaqmaq, more simply known as Al-Mansur Uthman (Arabic: المنصور فخر الدين عثمان بن جقمق) was Sultan of Cairo's Mamluk Burji dynasty (1453).

== Biography ==
The death of Sultan Jaqmaq at 80 years of age allowed his son, Uthman (fathered from a Greek slave), to take the title of Al-Malik al-Mansur Fakhr al-Din Uthman. His father named him Uthman after the House of Osman to celebrate the Ottoman victory against the European Christians at the Battle of Varna. At the beginning of his reign, he was whipped by his principal minister. After disputes with Amir on the amount of donations to various groups of Mamelukes that had become a burden, street battles ensued between the groups of Mamelukes. Inal al-Ajrud group and the Mamluks house Barquq occupied Kalat al-Djabal (Fortress of the Mount). He was nominated as Sultan by the Abbasid Caliph of Cairo and four kadis with the title of Al-Malik al-Mansur Fakhr al-Din. Uthman had no support and, because of his behavior, was deposed on 15 March 1453.

He was then imprisoned in Alexandria until the reign of Sayf al-Din Khushqadam. He later returned to Cairo during the rule of Qaitbay who was a Mamluk to his father, Jaqmaq. In 1469, he went to Mecca to do Islamic pilgrimage. Then he lived in Damietta and studied Fiqh. He died in 1484 in Damietta and was later buried along with his father in Cairo.

== Family ==
His only daughter was married to Azdumur al-Ibrahimi al-Zahiri Jaqmaq known as al-Tawil in 1474.

== See also ==
- History of Islam

== Sources ==
- Clot, André (2009). L'Égypte des Mamelouks 1250-1517. L'empire des esclaves (in French). Paris: Perrin. ISBN 978-2-262-03045-2.
- Encyclopaedia of Islam, Brill Publishers, Leiden, sv "Mamluks".
