= Al-Nasir al-Din Muhammad =

Sultan of Egypt and Syria (r. 1421–1422)

An-Nasir ad-Din Muhammad

Sultan of Egypt and Syria
- Reign: 30 November 1421 – 1 April 1422
- Predecessor: Sayf al-Din Tatar
- Successor: Barsbay
- Born: 1411
- Died: 24 March 1430 (aged 18–19); Cairo
- Father: Sayf al-Din Tatar

Al-Nasir al-Din Muhammad (Arabic: الصالح ناصر الدين محمد بن ططر; 1411 – 24 March 1430) was the son of Sayf al-Din Tatar, and a Mamluk sultan of Egypt and Syria from 30 November 1421 to 1 April 1422.

== Biography ==
At around 10 years old, al-Nasir al-Din Muhammad became successor to his father, Sultan Sayf al-Din Tatar, on November 28, 1421, who died two days later. Conflicts among emirs ensued, with Barsbay eventually seizing power. Deposed on April 1, 1422, Al-Nasir al-Din Muhammad spent years in a palace in Cairo before his death from the plague in March 1430.

== Sources ==
- Ibn Taghribirdi (1929). Al-Nujūm al-Zāhirah fī Mulūk Miṣr wa-al-Qāhirah (in Arabic). Vol. 14. Egyptian Dar al-Kutub Press in Cairo.

Regnal titles
Preceded by Sayf al-Din Tatar	Mamluk Sultan of Egypt; 30 November 1421–1 April 1422	Succeeded by Barsbay
