= Al-Mu'ayyad Shaykh =

Sultan of Egypt and Syria (r. 1412–1421)

Al-Mu'ayyad Shaykh المؤيد شيخ
- al-Malik al-Mu'ayyad
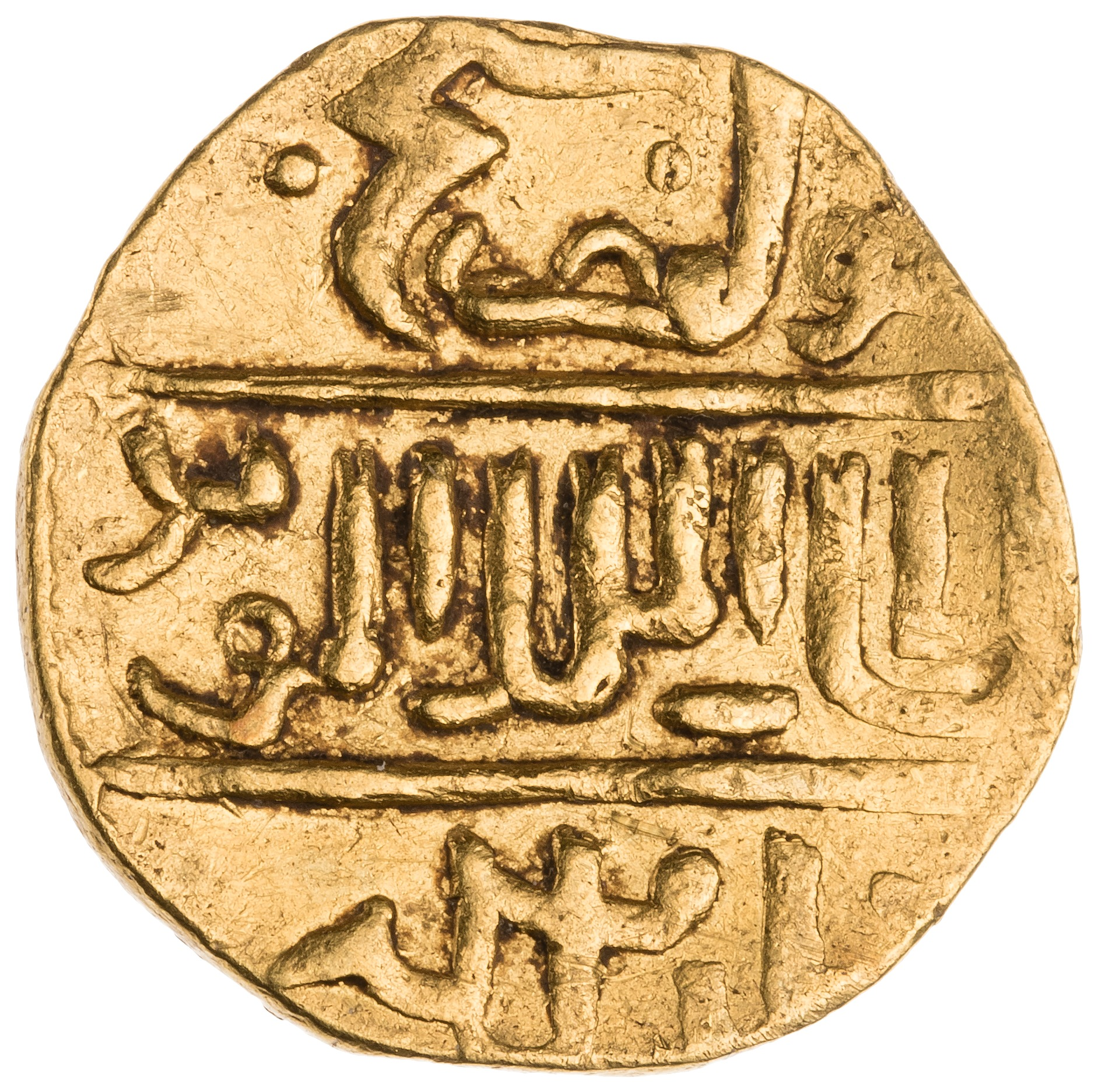
- Gold dinar of Shaykh minted in Cairo between 1412 and 1421

Sultan of Egypt and Syria
- Reign: 6 November 1412 – 13 January 1421
- Predecessor: al-Musta'in billah
- Successor: al-Muzaffar Ahmad
- Born: c. 1369
- Died: 13 January 1421 (aged 51–52)
- Spouse: Khawand Khadija; Khawand Zaynab; Khawand Sa'adat; Qutlubay
- Issue: al-Muzaffar Ahmad; Sidi Ibrahim; Khawand Asiya
Names
- Al-Malik al-Muʾayyad Sayf ad-Dīn Abū'l Nasr Shaykh al-Maḥmūdī الملك المؤيد سيف الدين أبو النصر شيخ المحمودي
- Religion: Sunni Islam

Al-Malik al-Muʾayyad Sayf ad-Dīn Abū'l Nasr Shaykh al-Maḥmūdī (Arabic: الملك المؤيد سيف الدين أبو النصر شيخ المحمودي; c. 1369 – 13 January 1421), commonly known as al-Mu'ayyad Shaykh, was a Mamluk sultan of Egypt from 1412 to 1421.

== Early career ==
At the age of twelve, Shaykh was purchased as a slave by Sultan Barquq. Having entered the service of the Sultan, he went through all the ranks. In 1400, he was appointed governor of Tripoli by Sultan An-Nasir Faraj during the Tamerlane's invasion of Syria. While the other emirs took refuge during the sack of Aleppo, he dared to attack and was imprisoned before he managed to escape.

Following Tamerlane's departure, he was appointed as governor of Damascus. In 1404, he allied himself with Yazbak, in which both seriously threatened An-Nasir Faraj's rule in Syria but they were ultimately defeated. A year later, a new sedition deposed the sultan, who had to flee and was replaced by his brother al-Mansur Abd al-Aziz. Yazbak's party triumphed and al-Mu'ayyad became lieutenant general of the sultanate. He returned to the government of Damascus after the re-establishment of An-Nasir Faraj. He even seemed to be a faithful servant by assisting the latter in suppressing the revolt of Djakam, emir of Aleppo, who proclaimed himself sultan. However, An-Nasir Faraj recklessly arrested al-Mu'ayyad who escaped and recaptured Damascus from Nawroz, his designated successor, to whom he ceded the governance of Tripoli. In 1409, Nasir Faraj returned to Damascus, where al-Mu'ayyad protested his loyalty to the sultan.

In 1410, he along with other emirs took control of Cairo where they attempted to establish An-Nasir Faraj's son as sultan. As Sultan approached, al-Mu'ayyad retreated to Suez. An-Nasir Faraj pardoned him once again and gave him the government of Aleppo. In 1412, a new rebellion forced the sultan to return to Damascus, but this time the sultan, abandoned by his troops, was beaten and had to surrender to the insurgents. On 23 May 1412, An-Nasir Faraj was arrested and killed in the Citadel of Damascus. Later on, al-Mu'ayyad returned to Cairo and conspired to make the Abbasid caliph al-Musta'in billah unpopular, before he managed to dismiss him after seven months of reign and was proclaimed sultan.

== Reign ==
The situation that al-Mu'ayyad found in Cairo was chaotic, the plague was wreaking havoc on the population, famine reigned and the currency was devalued. Al-Mu'ayyad had to take corrective measures. The monetary situation was fixed, Bedouin incursions were repressed, and the agricultural production resumed with the price of cereals fell.

Nawroz, emir of Damascus, refused to recognize al-Mu'ayyad as new sultan, and proclaimed holy war under the pretext of the destitution of the caliph. In July 1414, Nawroz was defeated, arrested and put to death after being besieged in Damascus.

After restoring order, al-Mu'ayyad prepared to wage war in Anatolia. Tarsus had just been taken from the Ramadanids by Mehmed of Dulkadir. In 1415, Al-Muayyad returned Tarsus to the Ramadanid emir Shihāb al-Dīn Ahmad. In 1418, danger came from the Turkmen Qara Qoyunlu, where Tarsus was recaptured. Al-Mu'ayyad sent his son Ibrahim to regain what was lost, in which he managed to take Kayseri, Konya and Karaman.

In the meantime, the Cypriots attempted a landing at Damour in 1413. Al-Mu'ayyad responded by organizing a landing on the island, which prompted King Janus to sign a peace agreement, despite continuing Catalan pirates' raids on the coasts of Egypt and Syria.

Al-Mu'ayyad died on 13 January 1421 and was succeeded by his young son, al-Muzaffar Ahmad.

== Family ==
Shaykh's first wife was Khawand Khadija, whom he married before his accession to the throne. Another wife was Khawand Zaynab, the daughter of Sultan Barquq. She died in February–March 1423, and was buried in the mausoleum of her father. Another wife was Khawand Sa'adat. She was the daughter of Sirgitmish, and was the mother of his son Sultan Al-Muzaffar Ahmad. After Shaykh's death, she married Sultan Sayf ad-Din Tatar. She died in 1430. One of his concubines was Qutlubay, a Circassian. She was the mother of his son Sidi Ibrahim. After Shaykh's death she married Amir Inal al-Jakami. Ibrahim married Satita, daughter of Sultan An-Nasir Faraj. His only daughter was Khawand Asiya. She died in 1486.

== Architectural patronage ==
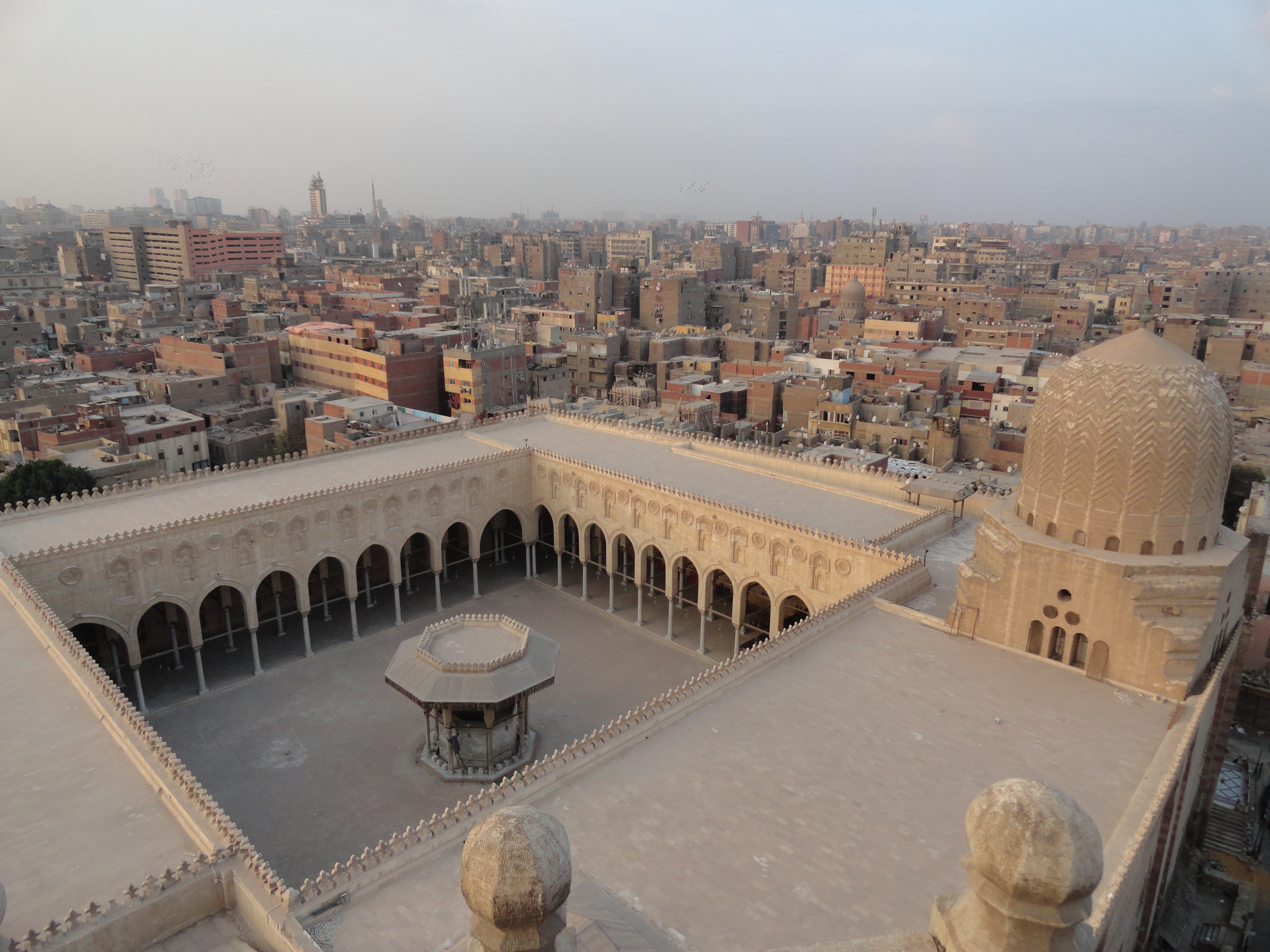
The Mosque of Sultan al-Muayyad, which includes his domed mausoleum (right), was built in Cairo from 1415 to 1420

Al-Mu'ayyad was one of the major patrons of Mamluk architecture in his era, commissioning or restoring a number of buildings around Cairo. Between 1415 and 1420, he built a large mosque and funerary complex, the Mosque of Sultan al-Muayyad. It is located adjacent to Bab Zuweila, above which he built the mosque's two minarets. A large hammam associated with the complex was also built nearby, partially preserved today. Upon his death, al-Mu'ayyad was buried in the mausoleum attached to the mosque.

Another of his construction projects still partially preserved today is the Maristan of al-Mu'ayyad in Darb al-Ahmar, a hospital (maristan) built between 1418 and 1420. His other contributions included a mosque on Roda Island, a khanqah in Giza, a palace called al-Khamas Wujuh along the Khalij (canal) on the northern edge of Cairo, and a palace along the Nile in present-day Imbaba, but none of these are still extant. He also restored the hippodrome (training ground) near the Nile River which had been previously built by al-Nasir Muhammad and since abandoned.

== Sources ==
- Behrens-Abouseif, Doris (2007). Cairo of the Mamluks: A History of Architecture and its Culture. The American University in Cairo Press. ISBN 9789774160776.
- Clot, André (2009). L'Égypte des Mamelouks 1250-1517. L'empire des esclaves, capítol "Misère, peste et disette" (in French). Perrin. ISBN 9782262030452.
- Michaud, Louis Gabriel; Michaud, Joseph Fr. (1820). Biographie universelle, ancienne et moderne, Volume 26 (in French). University of California.
- Ibn Taghribirdi (1929). Al-Nujūm al-Zāhirah fī Mulūk Miṣr wa-al-Qāhirah (in Arabic). Vol. 14. Egyptian Dar al-Kutub Press in Cairo.

Regnal titles
Preceded by Al-Musta'in	Mamluk Sultan of Egypt; 6 November 1412 – 13 January 1421	Succeeded by Al-Muzaffar Ahmad
