= Sayf al-Din Tatar =

Sultan of Egypt and Syria
- Reign: 29 August 1421 – 30 November 1421
- Predecessor: Al-Muzaffar Ahmad
- Successor: Al-Nasir al-Din Muhammad
- Born: unknown
- Died: 30 November 1421
- Spouse: Khawand Sa'adat
- Issue: Al-Nasir al-Din Muhammad; Khawand Zaynab; Sitt al-Muluk

Sayf al-Din Tatar (Arabic: الظاهر سيف الدين ططر; d. 30 November 1421) was a Mamluk sultan of Egypt from 29 August to 30 November 1421.

== Biography ==
Of Circassian descent, Tatar arrived in Cairo around 1399 as a young slave. He managed to carve out a path to prominence and eventually ascending to the rank of Emir. Even prior to the funeral of Sultan Al-Mu'ayyad Shaykh, he solidified his standing among the Mamluk elite and swiftly assumed control as regent for the young Sultan Al-Muzaffar Ahmad.

However, Tatar's rise to power wasn't without opposition. The viceroy of Damascus rebelled against his de facto authority, only to be subdued by his forces. Following his victory, Tatar seized Damascus, eliminating many of his adversaries and marrying the mother of the young sultan, Khawand Sa'adat. He eventually dethroned the sultan at the Citadel of Damascus on August 29, 1421, claiming the Mamluk throne for himself before returning to Cairo.

However, he contracted a chronic illness, and his health declined rapidly, culminating in his demise on November 30, 1421. Just two days prior, he designated his son, Al-Nasir al-Din Muhammad, as his successor to the throne.

== Family ==
One of his wives was the daughter of Qutlubugha Hajji al-Banaqusi al-Turkmani al-Halabi. They together had one daughter, Khawand Fatima, who married Sultan Barsbay, and died on 30 August 1469. Another wife was the daughter of Sudun al-Faqih. Another wife was Khawand Sa'adat. She was the daughter of Sirghitmish, and had been previously married to Sultan Al-Mu'ayyad Shaykh. They married on 4 August 1421. She died in 1430. He had one son, An-Nasir ad-Din Muhammad, who reigned between 1421 and 1422. Another daughter was Sitt al-Muluk. She was married to Yashbak as-Suduni, the commander-in-chief.

== Sources ==
- Ibn Taghribirdi (1929). Al-Nujūm al-Zāhirah fī Mulūk Miṣr wa-al-Qāhirah (in Arabic). Vol. 14. Egyptian Dar al-Kutub Press in Cairo.

Regnal titles
Preceded by Al-Muzaffar Ahmad	Mamluk Sultan of Egypt; 29 August 1421–30 November 1421	Succeeded by Al-Nasir al-Din Muhammad
