= Wikala of al-Ghuri =

Wikala of Sultan al-Ghuri
- وكالة الغوري
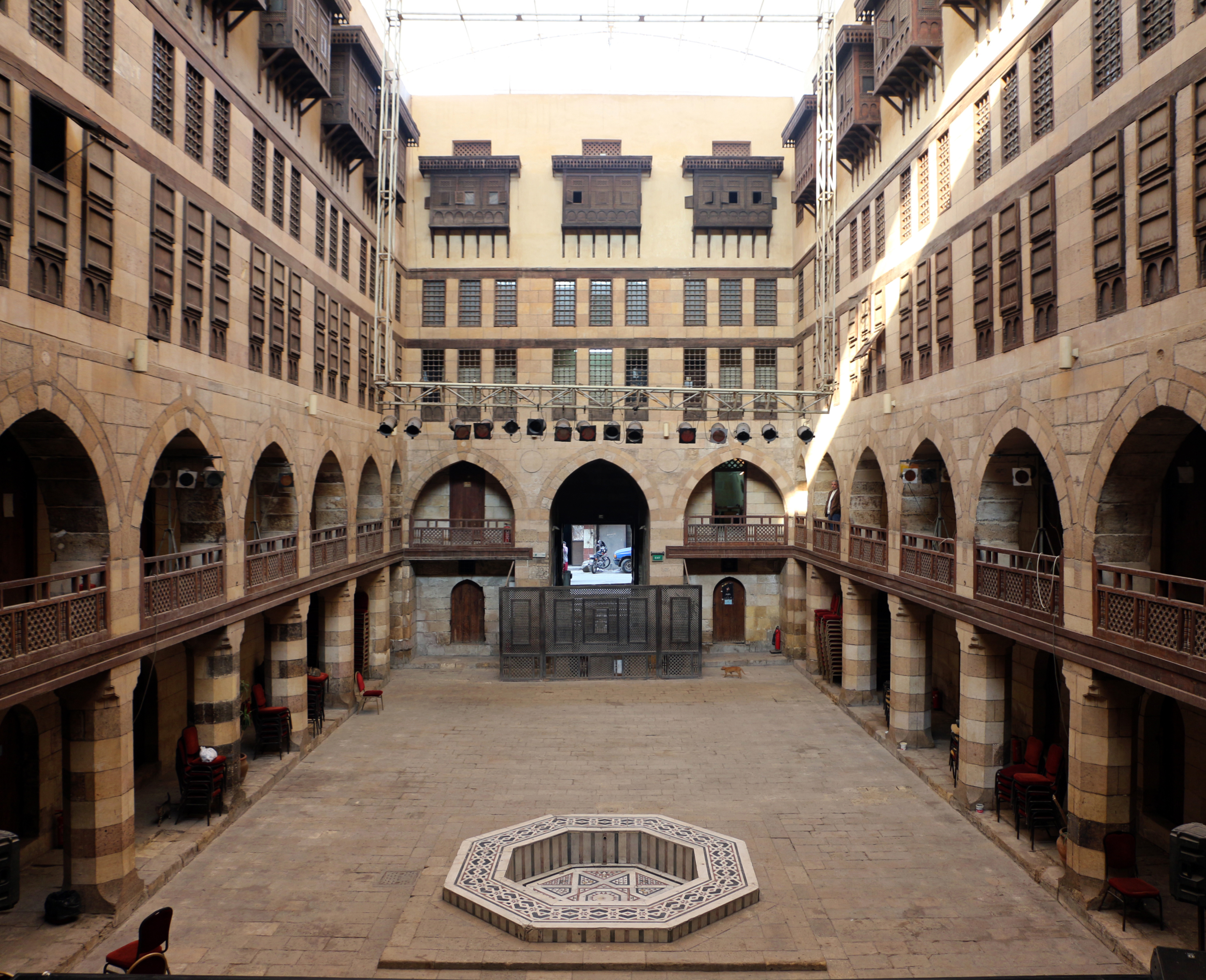
- Wikala of al-Ghuri, central courtyard.
- Interactive map of the Wikala of Sultan al-Ghuri area
- Alternative names: Wikalat al-Ghuri

General information
- Type: Caravanserai, apartment complex
- Architectural style: Mamluk
- Location: Cairo, Egypt, Haret al-Souk - Sooq al-Tablitiah, ad-Darb al-Ahmar, Cairo Governorate, Egypt
- Coordinates: 30°02′44.6″N 31°15′39.2″E
- Completed: 1505
- Renovated: 2004
- Client: Sultan Qansuh al-Ghuri

Technical details
- Floor count: 5
- Floor area: 1,500 square metres (16,000 sq ft)

The Wikala of Sultan Qansuh al-Ghuri (or Wikalat al-Ghuri, among other variations) is a caravanserai in medieval Cairo, Egypt. It was built in 1504–1505 and is considered today one of the most impressive and best-preserved examples of this type of building in Cairo.

== History and function ==
The wikala (Arabic: وكالة; sometimes wakala or wekala) is a term for an urban caravanserai, a building which housed merchants and their goods and served as a center for trade, storage, transactions and other commercial activity. Merchants could thus base themselves here to do business in the city. The word wikala means roughly "agency" in Arabic; in this case, a commercial agency, which may also have been a reference to the customs offices that could be located here to deal with imported goods. Other examples of this sort are the nearby Wikala and Sabil-Kuttab of Sultan Qaytbay and the separate Wikala of Sultan Qaytbay in the north end of the city, both only partially preserved, as well as the well-preserved Wikala al-Bazar'a.

The Wikala of al-Ghuri was built by Sultan al-Ashraf Qansuh al-Ghuri in 1504-1505 (CE) as part of a large construction project involving the creation of a mausoleum and religious complex that included a khanqah (Sufi lodge), a sabil-kuttab (water dispensary plus elementary school), and a mosque-madrasa. This religious and civic complex was located just west of the wikala and its revenues were intended to help finance its operations.

The wikala building also included a rabʿ, a low-income apartment complex for permanent residence, above the wikala itself, combining two functions that yielded revenues. All these functions were established through a waqf, a protected agreement which gave certain buildings and revenues the status of charitable endowments guaranteed under sharia.

The building was most recently restored in 2004. Today it houses workshops and studios for artisans, local offices, and serves as a venue for cultural shows including Sufi whirling, generally aimed at tourists.

== Description ==
The building has five stories centered around a large rectangular courtyard. The first two stories are built in stone and distinguished by a portico of tall arches around the courtyard, while the three upper floors are made of brick and marked by regular rows of windows and (on the highest floor) mashrabiyas. Animals (pack animals or livestock) and merchandise would be kept on the ground floor, while the second floor housed the merchants (and possibly some merchandise as well). The three upper floors, above the portico, were part of the rab' (a complex of low-income apartments for rent). Each apartment was arranged vertically across three floors, with the first floor usually featuring a reception room and latrines and the upper floors containing sleeping quarters and other private spaces. In the middle of the main courtyard is a fountain decorated in marble mosaics.

The building's only external facade faces the street to the north, and is distinguished by its regular rows of windows and mashrabiyas just like its interior courtyard facade. The entrance is marked by a monumental portal that is ornately decorated with a trilobed groin vault, stone-carved muqarnas, marble mosaics, and alternating colored stone. Such monumentality was not typical of most wikalas, but it was a notable characteristic of both religious and commercial structures built by al-Ghuri and his predecessor Sultan Qaitbay (who built two other major wikalas as mentioned above).

== Gallery ==
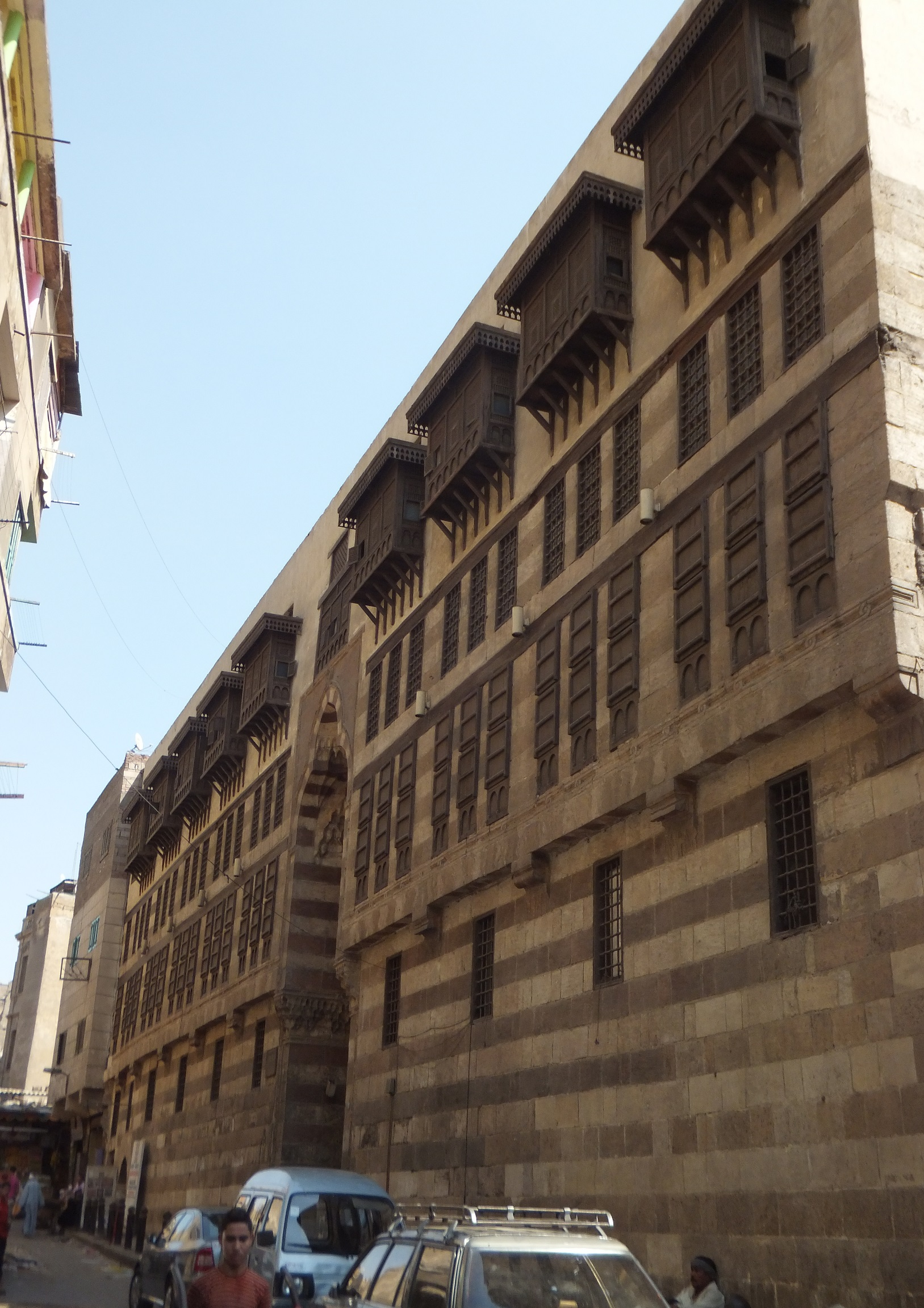
The street facade of the wikala

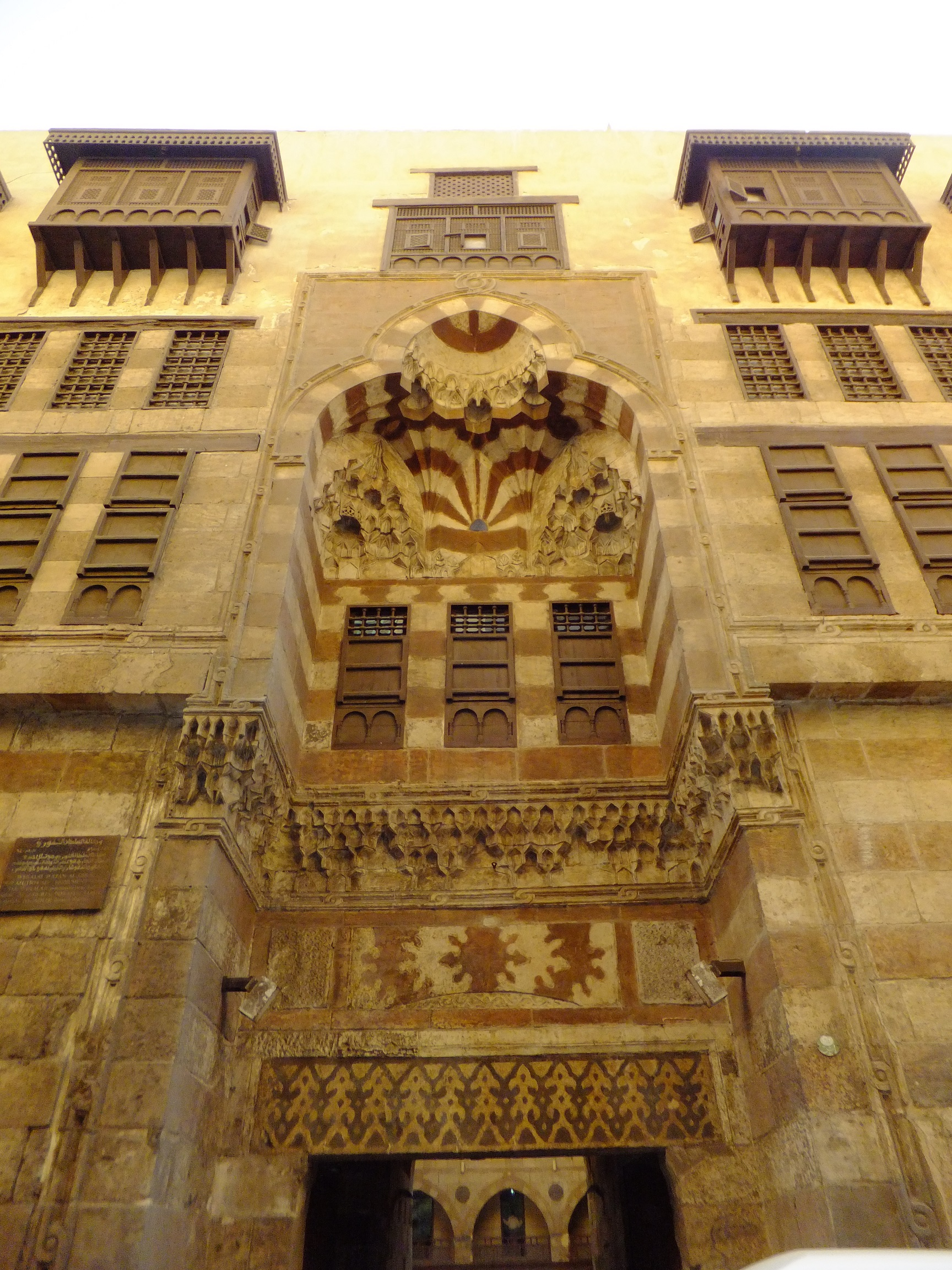
The entrance portal

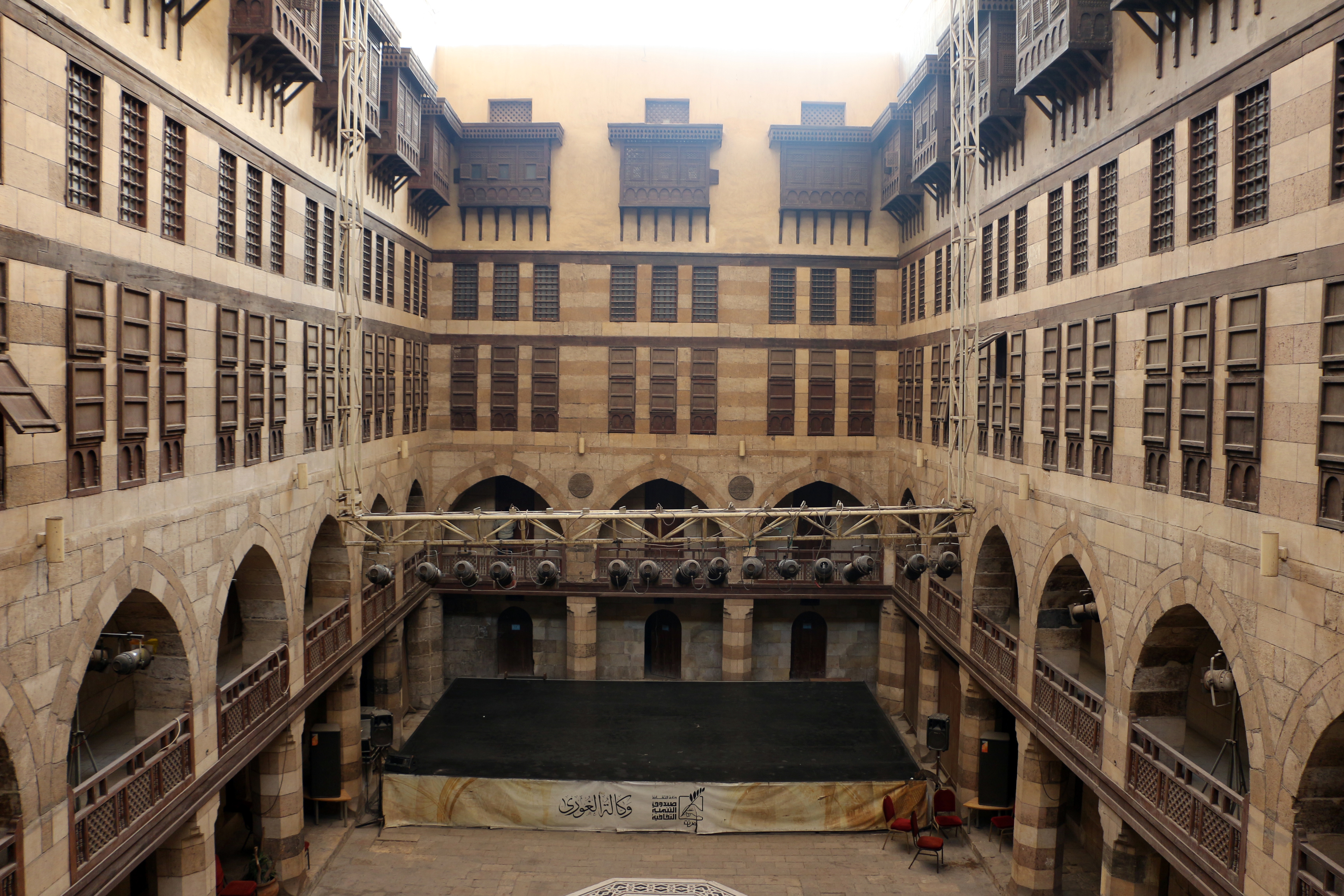
The courtyard (with stage equipment for cultural shows)

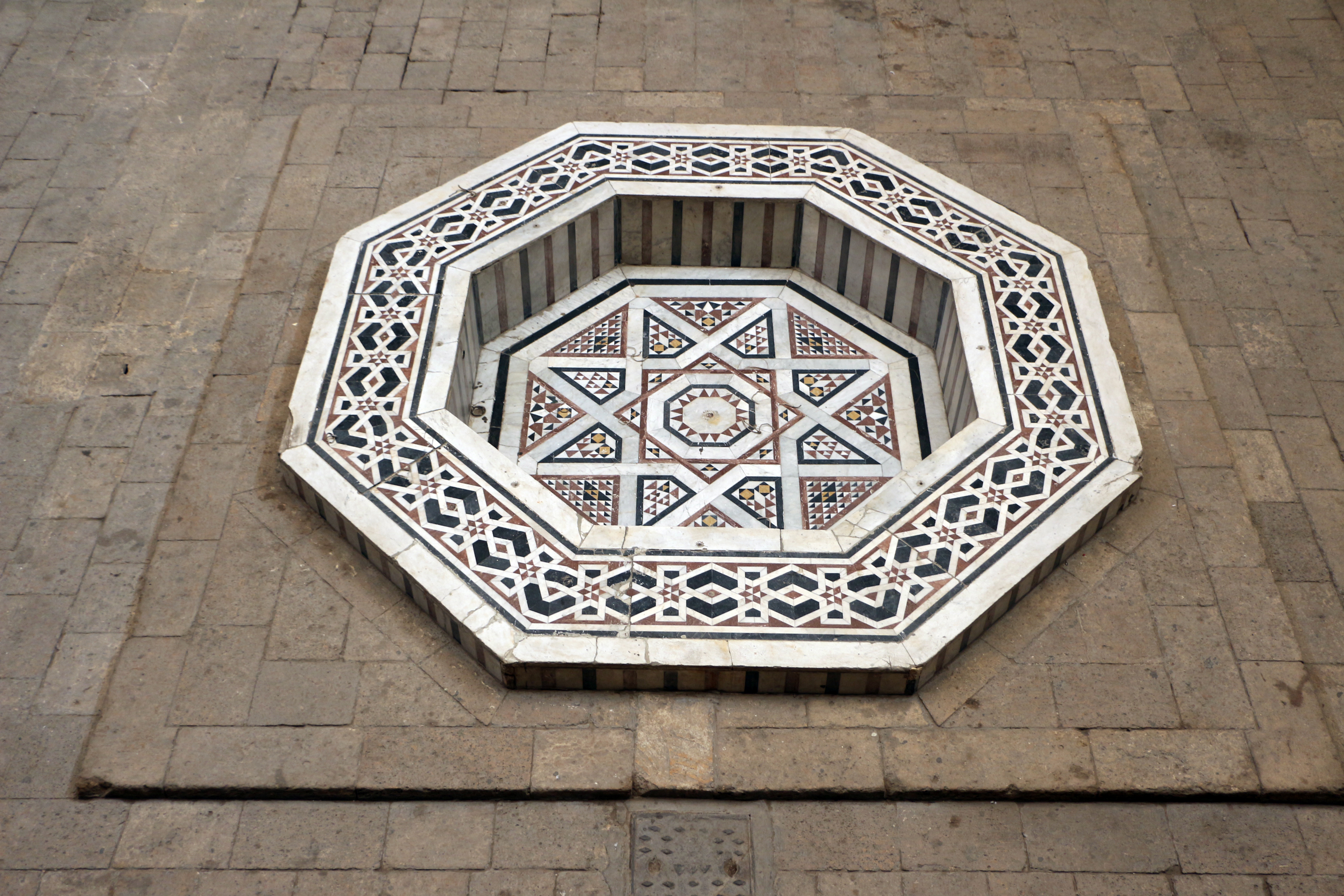
The courtyard fountain

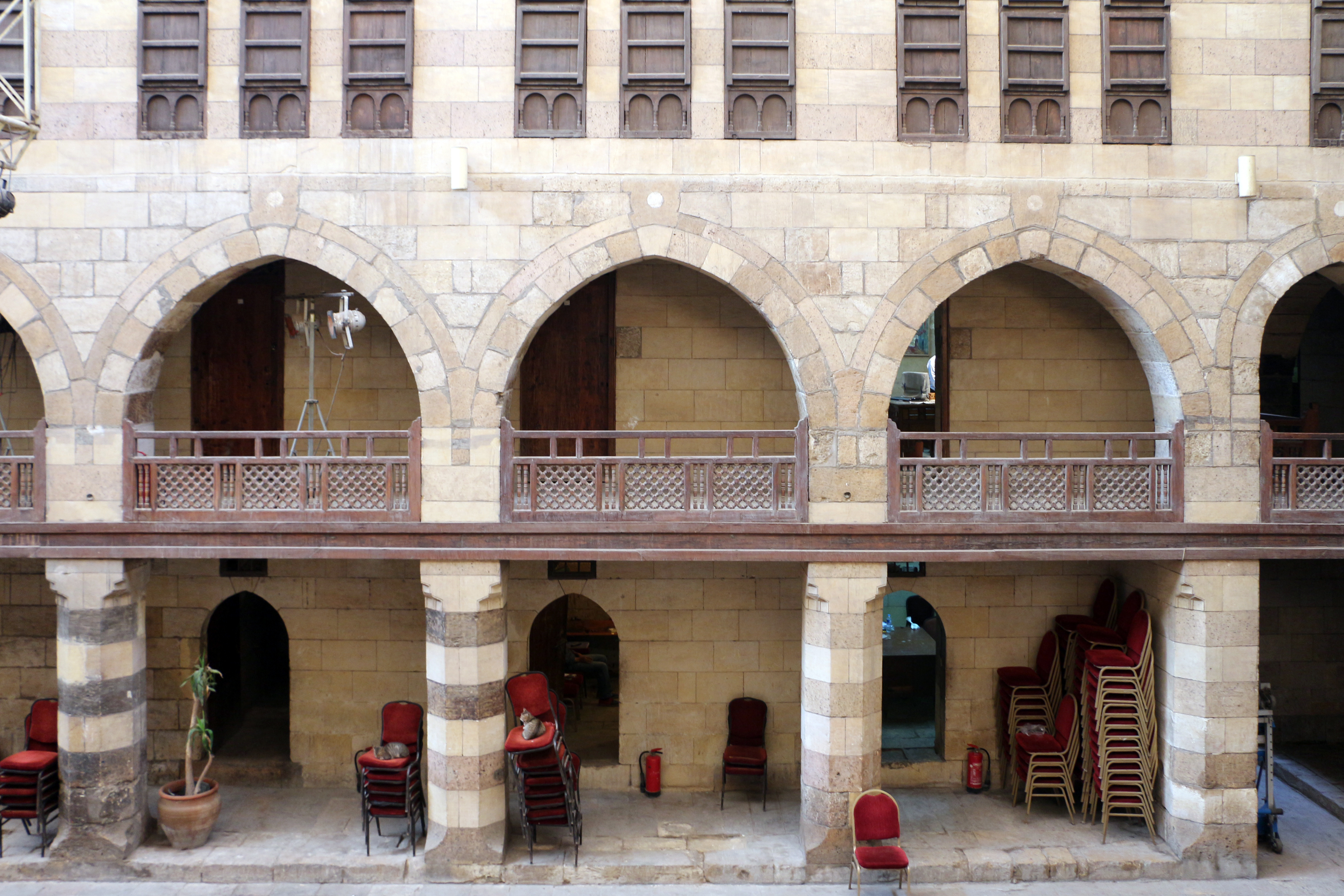
Stone arches along the courtyard

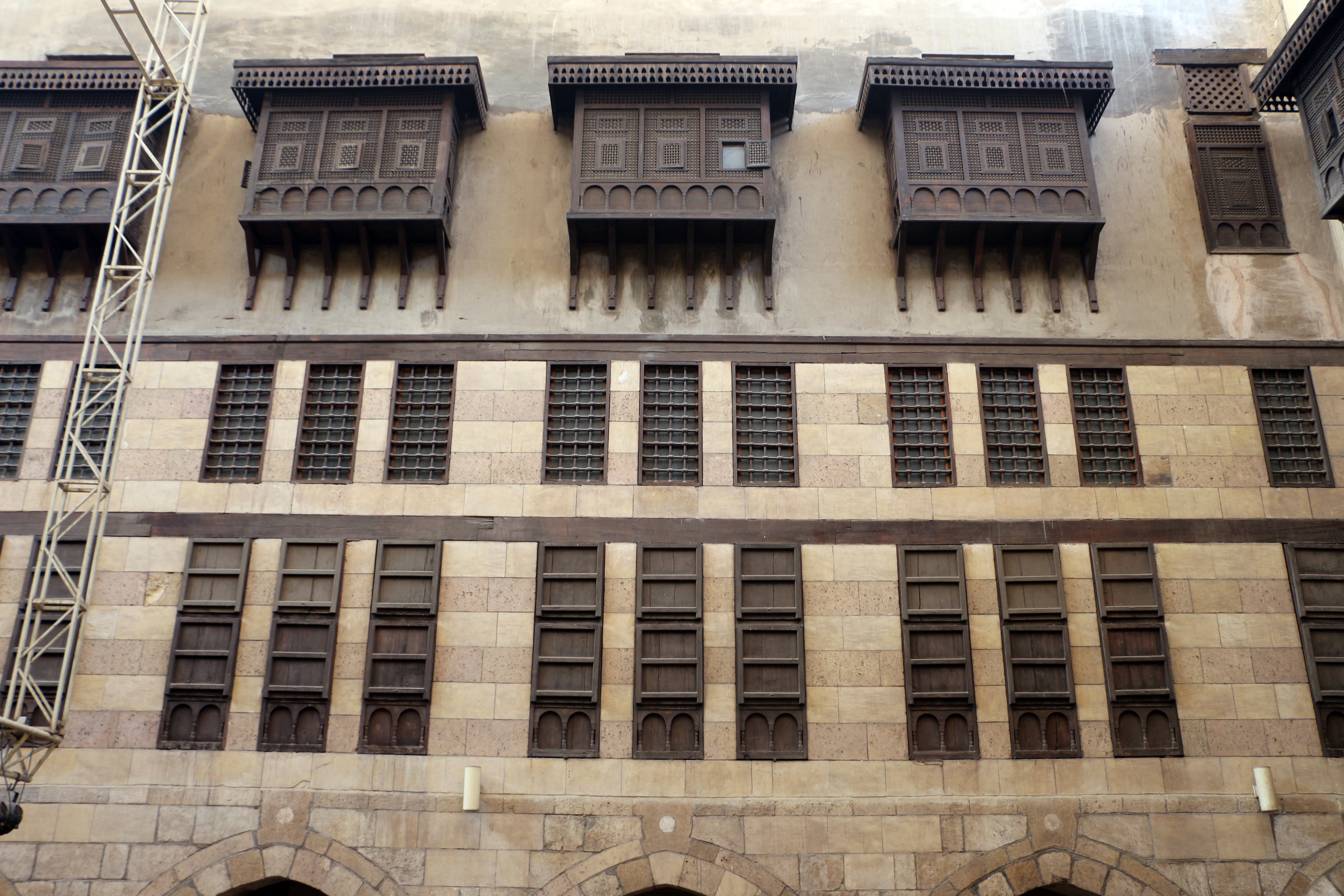
The facade of the upper floors around the courtyard

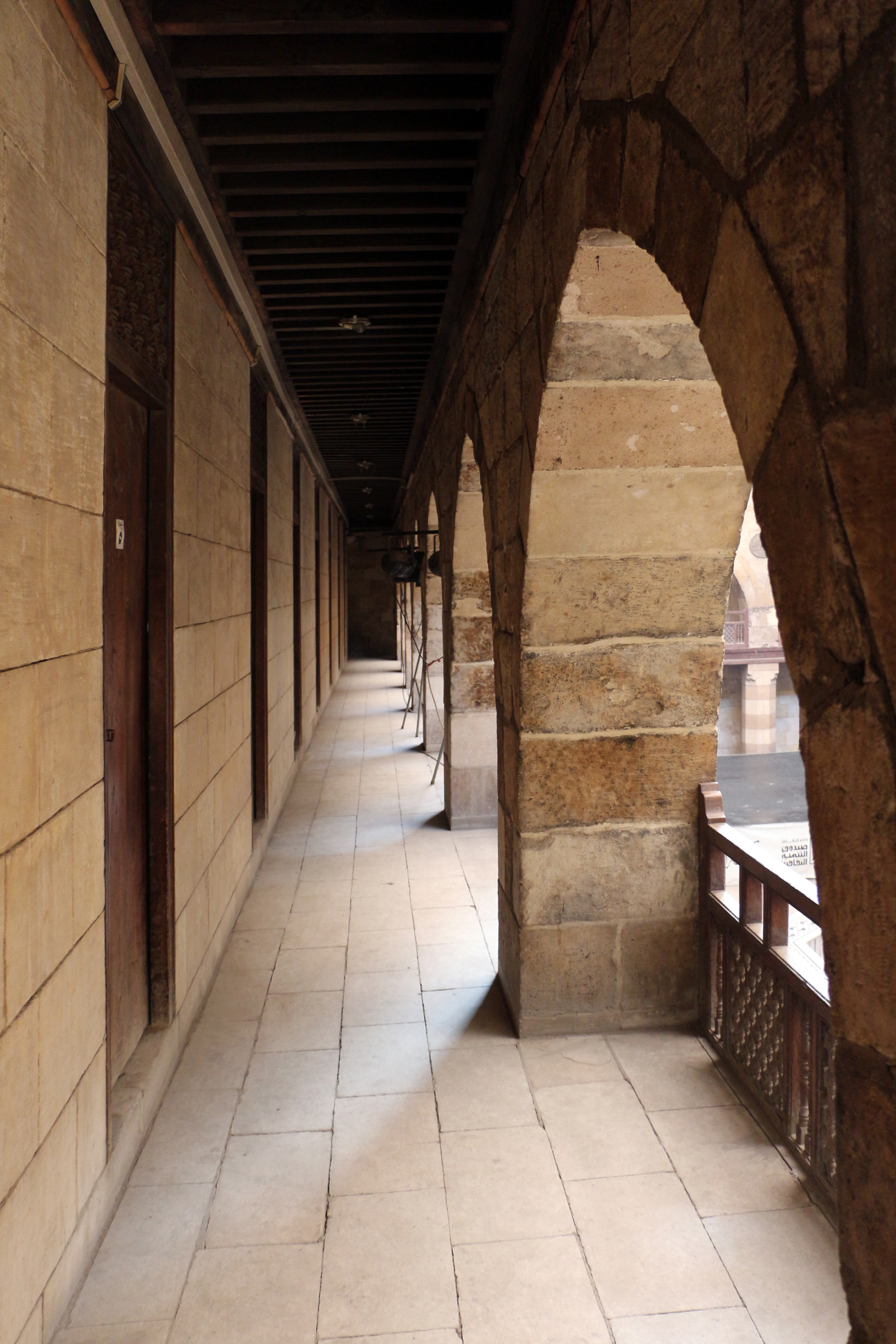
The second level

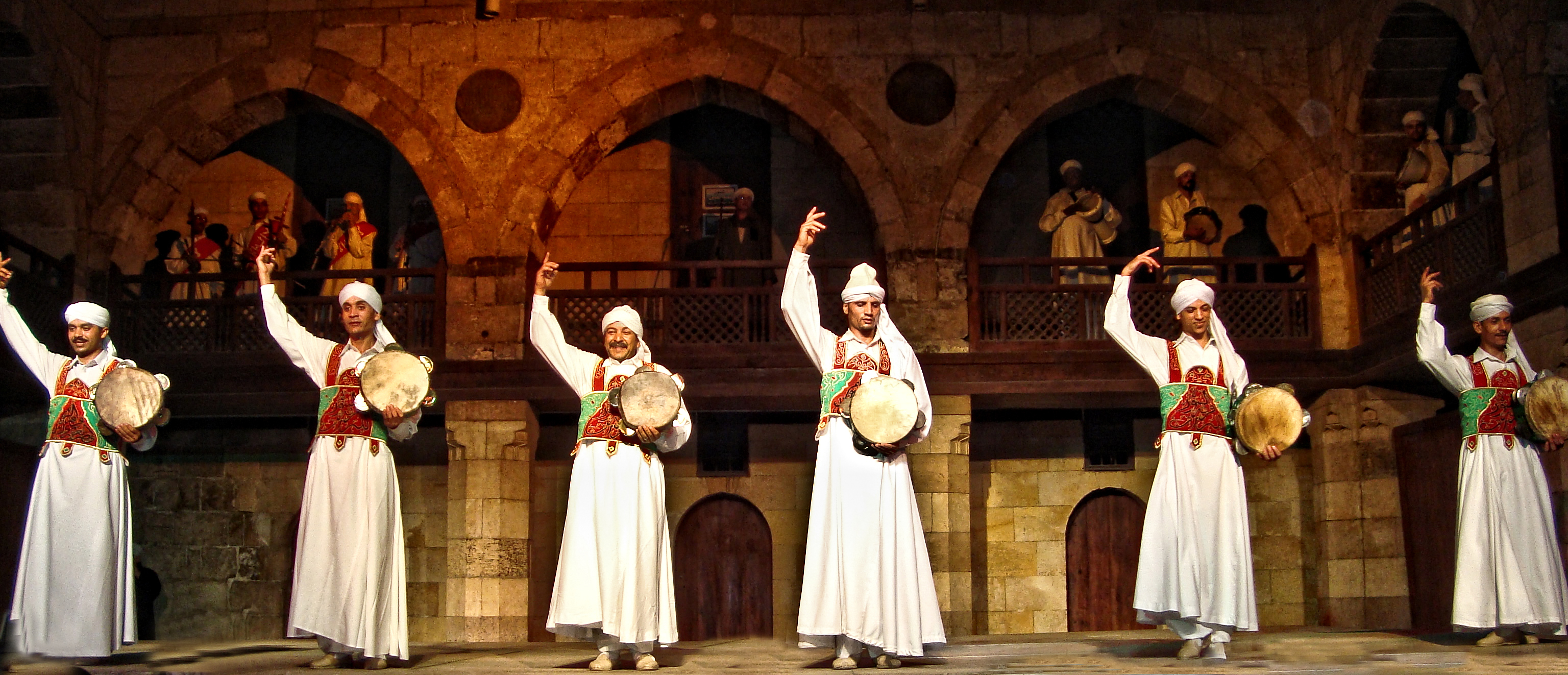
One of the cultural shows that take place in the wikala today.
