= Wikala and Sabil-Kuttab of Sultan Qaytbay =

Building in Cairo, Egypt

Coordinates: 30.04521°N 31.26241°E

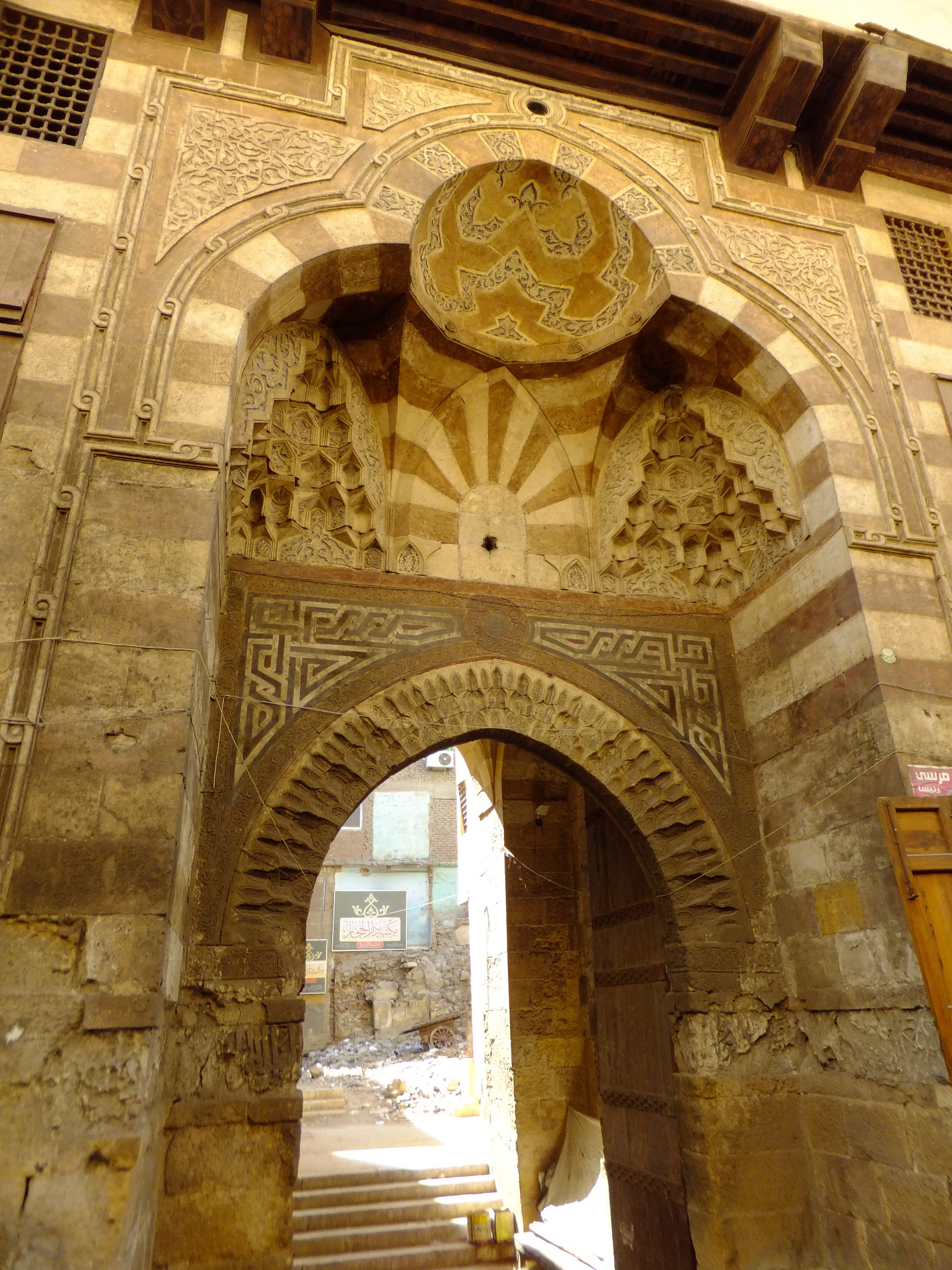
Main portal.

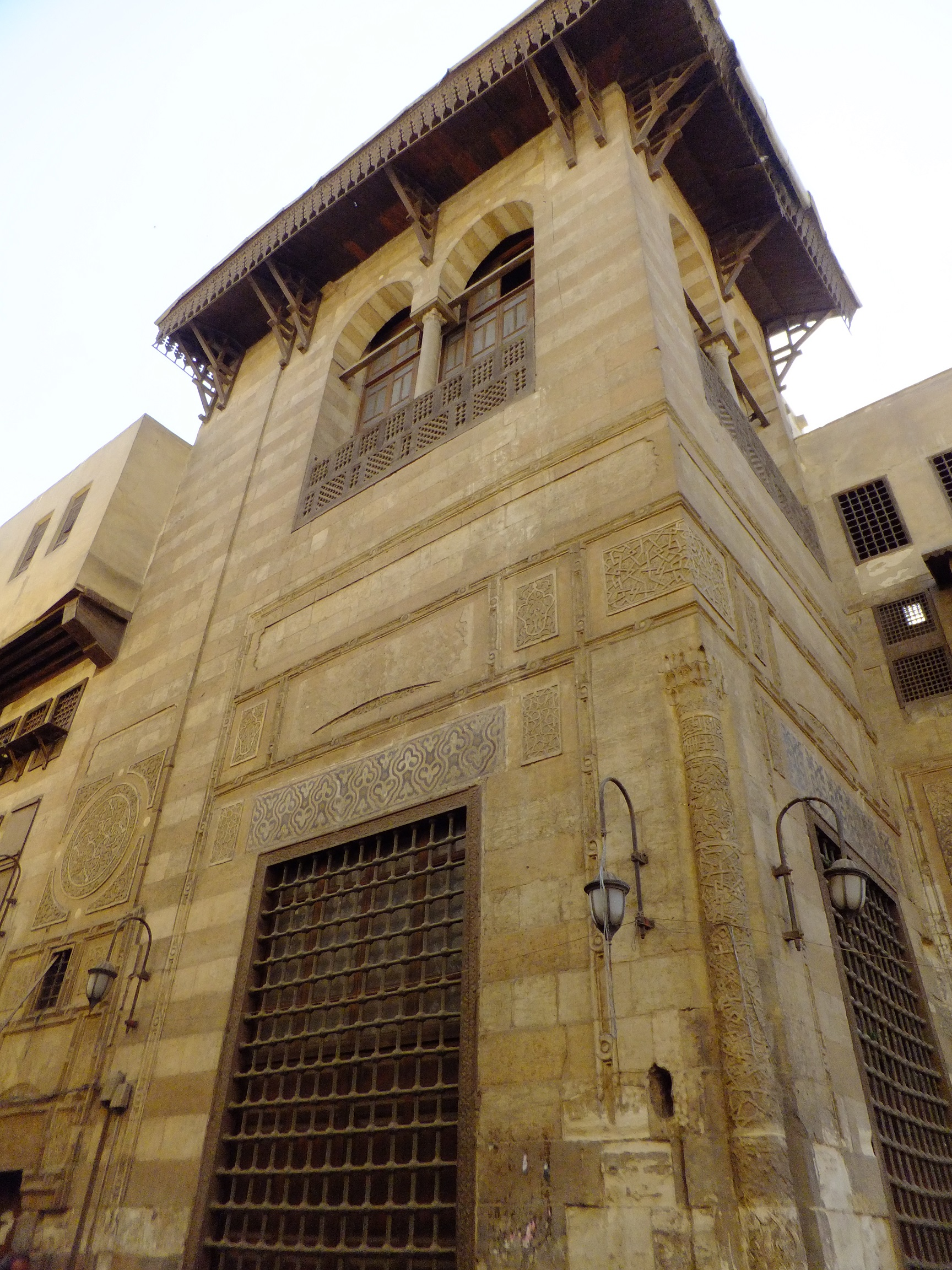
The sabil (below) and kuttab (above).

The Wikala and Sabil-Kuttab of Sultan Qaytbay is a complex of monuments built by the Mamluk sultan Al-Ashraf Abu Al-Nasr Qaitbay in 1477 CE (882 AH) in Islamic Cairo, the historic medieval district of Cairo, Egypt. The complex consists of an urban caravanserai (wikala, also spelled wakala), a water dispensary (sabil), a water trough (hod), and a school (kuttab). It is located just south of Al-Azhar Mosque.

== Historical context ==
It is one of the two wikalas built by Sultan Qa’it Bay during his reign, the other one being Wikala of Sultan Qaytbay on Bab Al-Nasr street. Though the ground floor originally contained storerooms, in modern times it is inhabited by residents of Cairo, while the original living units upstairs are abandoned. The primary function of a sabil was as a public work, to provide water to the community. Charitable acts, especially the supply of food and water to the needy, were considered enormously pious in medieval Islam. The giving of water was especially important to the people of Cairo, because of the city's dry climate and distance from the Nile. Mamluk rulers, including Sultan Qa'it Bay, would grant waqf endowments to maintain aesthetically-pleasing sabils as acts of piety, or even as a method through which to ask God for mercy on those in need of the very services provided by the endowment.

== Architecture ==
The wikala portion makes up the majority of the complex, with the sabil-kuttab and a watering trough for animals lying on the western end. The structure has suffered damage over time, especially on the interior courtyard, but remains in use. In the late Burji Mamluk period, street-level sabils such as this one, were accompanied by a kuttab on the upper floors. The kuttab served as a place to teach children the Quran and was, again, considered a pious donation on part on the sultan. The wikala is a commercial extension of the caravansarai, consisting of a floor of various storerooms. The facade of wikala is built by stone, along with the entry portal of the sabil-kuttab. The south-facing entrance opens into a loggia and there is a wooden balcony leading into the kuttab. Inscriptions are seen on many parts of the building including the facade and entry portal. The trilobed entrance arch of the wikala is decorated with muqarnas as well. The polychrome facade has faded with age, but is still visible. A mashrabiya window can be seen on top of the entrance of the sabil-kuttab, but it is likely not part of the original structure. The sabil is richly decorated, as was common of Cairene sabils.
