= Qaitbay =

Mamluk Sultan of Egypt (1468–1496)

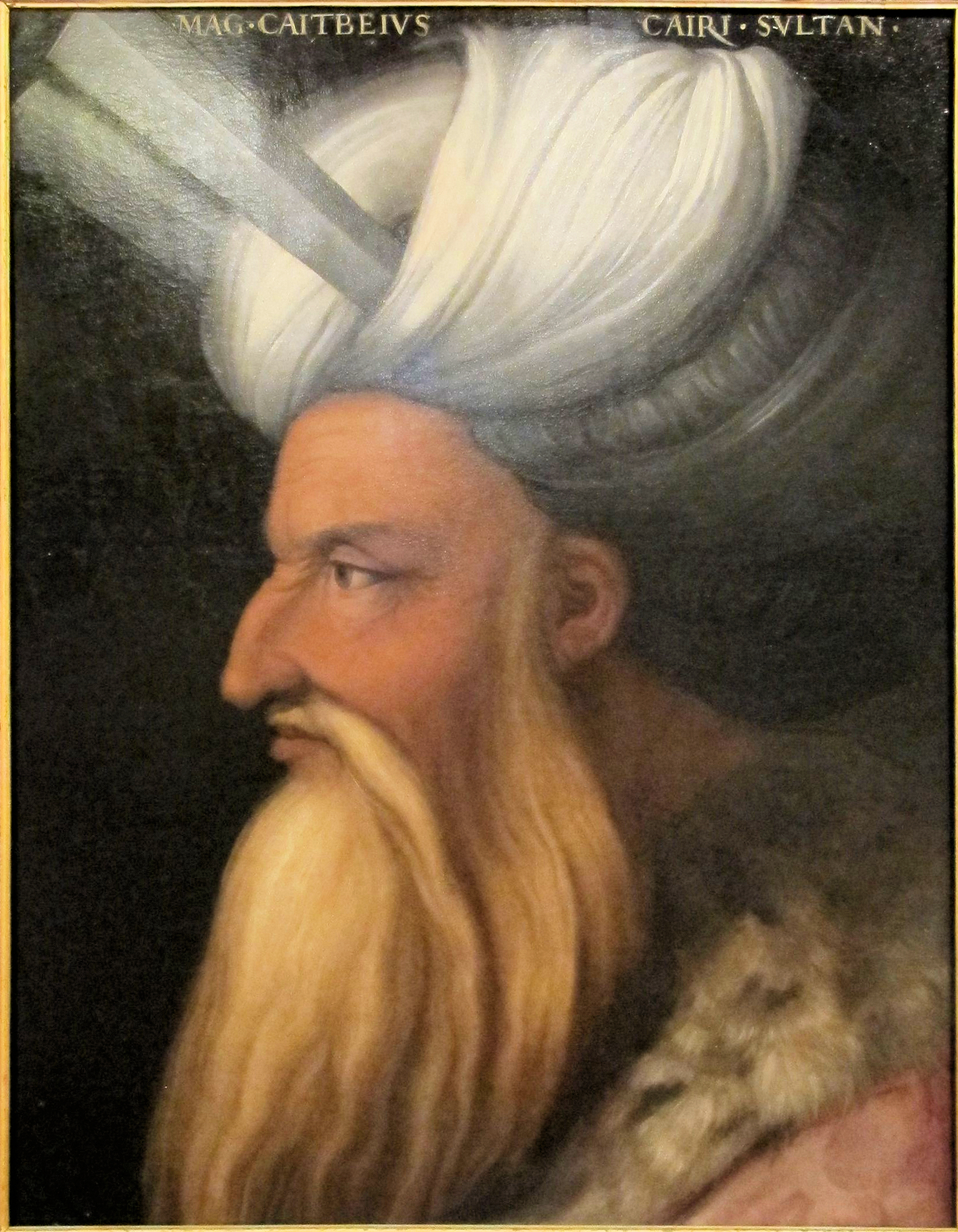
- Mamluk Sultan Qaytbay ("Mag Caitbeivs Cairi Svltan") by Florentine painter Cristofano dell'Altissimo (16th century), Galleria degli Uffizi

Sultan of Egypt and Syria
- Reign: 31 January 1468 – 7 August 1496
- Predecessor: Timurbugha
- Successor: an-Nasir Muhammad
- Born: c. 1416/1418; Circassia
- Died: 7 August 1496 (aged 77–80); Cairo, Egypt
- Spouse: Khawand Fatima; Khawand Zaynab; Khawand Aṣalbāy (concubine)
- Issue: An-Nasir Muhammad; Ahmed; Sitti Jarakisa
- Religion: Sunni Islam

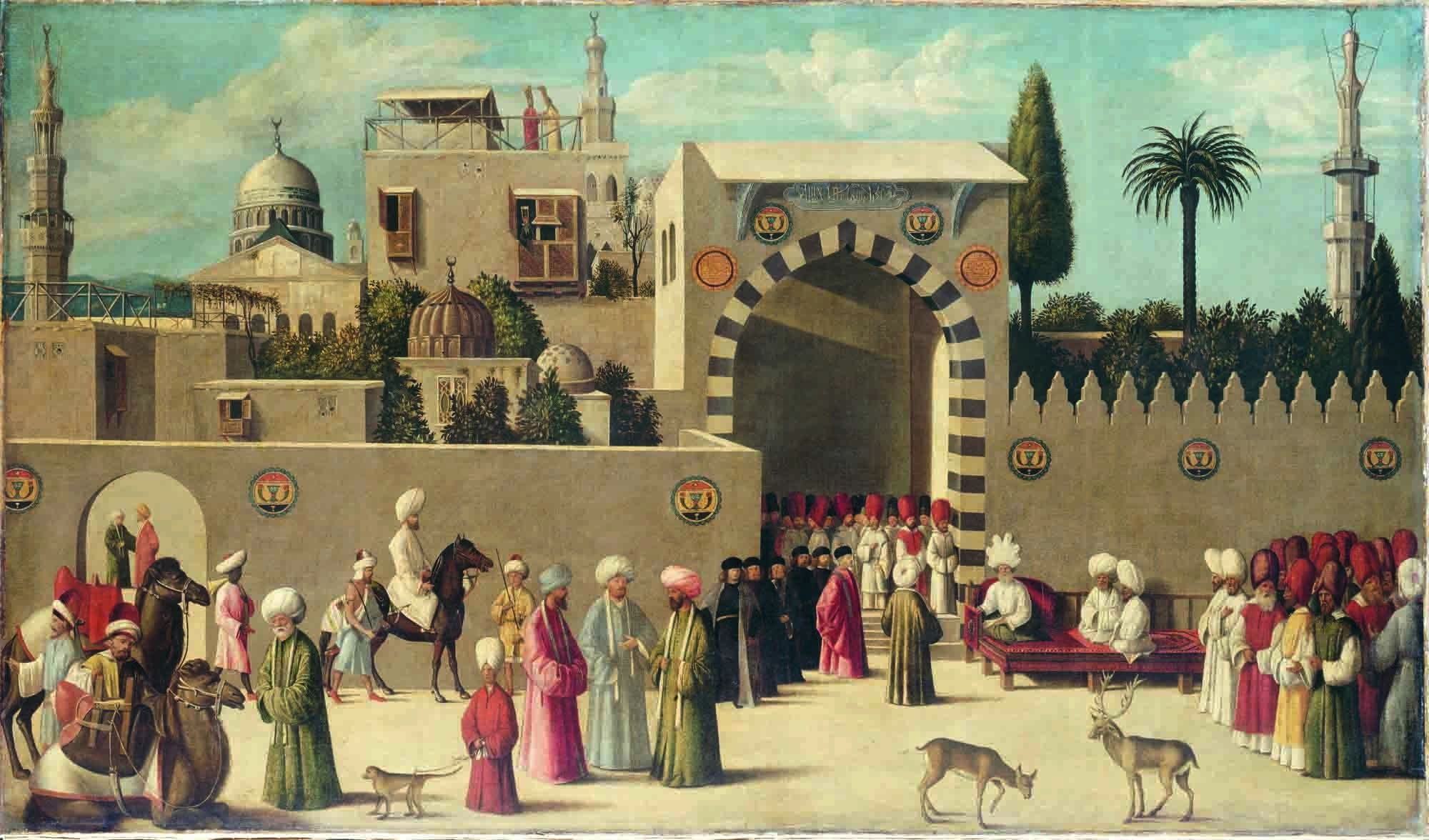
Anonymous Venetian painting depicting the reception of Venetian ambassadors in Damascus. The wall in the background is decorated with Qaitbay's blazon.

Abu Al-Nasr Sayf ad-Din Al-Ashraf Qaitbay (Note: Arabic: أبو النصر سيف الدين الأشرف قايتباي) (c. 1416/1418 – 7 August 1496) (Note: Other transliterations of his name include Qaytbay, Kait Bey, and Qayt Bay.) was the eighteenth Burji Mamluk Sultan of Egypt from 872 to 901 A.H. (1468–1496 C.E.). He was Circassian by birth, and was purchased by the ninth sultan Barsbay (1422 to 1438 C.E.) before being freed by the eleventh Sultan Jaqmaq (1438 to 1453 C.E.). A pious Sultan, he stabilized the Mamluk state and economy, consolidated the northern boundaries of the Sultanate with the Ottoman Empire, engaged in trade with other contemporaneous polities. Founding numerous religious buildings and endowing them with hundreds of waqfs, Qaitbay emerged as a great patron of art and architecture. In fact, although Qaitbay fought sixteen military campaigns, he is best remembered for the spectacular building projects that he sponsored, leaving his mark as an architectural patron on Mecca, Medina, Jerusalem, Damascus, Aleppo, Alexandria, and every quarter of Cairo.

== Biography ==
=== Early life ===
Qaitbay was born between 1416 and 1418 in Circassia in the Caucasus. Skilled in archery and horsemanship, he was enslaved (see Black Sea slave trade) and taken to Cairo around 1440. He was quickly purchased by the reigning sultan Barsbay and assigned to the palace guard.

Barsbay's successor Jaqmaq emancipated Qaitbay after learning that he was a descendant of the Ayyubid Emir of Damascus Al-Ashraf Musa (d. 1237). Jaqmaq then appointed the freed Qaitmat third executive secretary.

Under the sultans Sayf ad-Din Inal, Khushqadam and Yilbay, Qaitbay was further promoted through the Mamluk military hierarchy. He eventually achieved the rank taqaddimat alf, commander of 1,000 Mamluks. Under the Sultan Timurbugha, finally, Qaitbay was appointed atabak, or field marshal, of the entire Mamluk army. Qaitbay amassed a considerable personal fortune which as sultan he would use for charitable endowments.

=== Accession ===
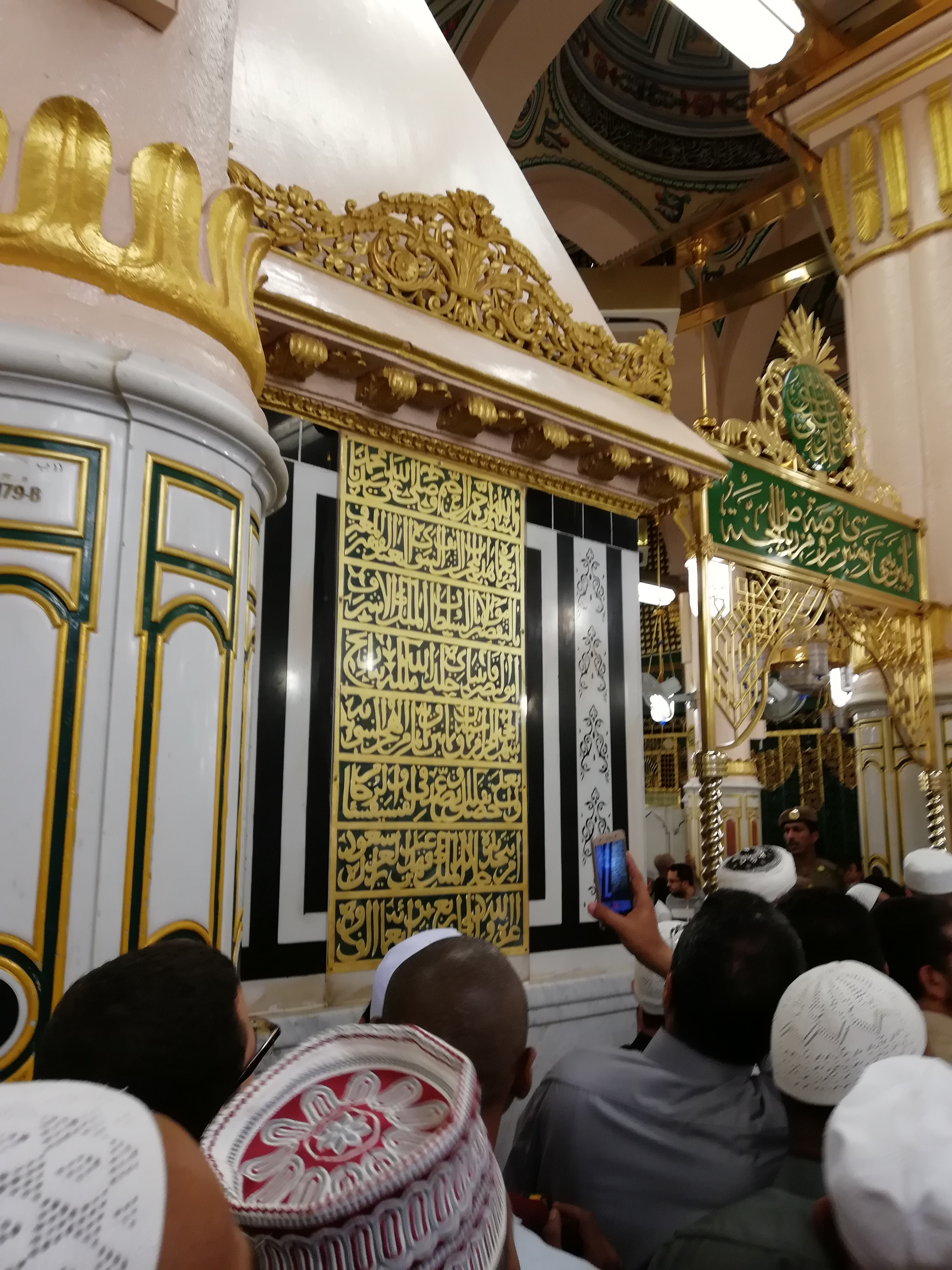
Qaitbay plate at Prophet's Mosque in Medina, located behind the Mihrab Al-Nabawi (the main mihrab)

The reign of Timurbugha lasted less than two months; he was deposed in a palace coup on 30 January 1468. Qaitbay was proposed as a compromise candidate to replace Timurbugha, who would be acceptable to the various court factions. He was made Sultan on 31 January.

Qaitbay insisted that Timurburgha be granted an honorable retirement instead of the enforced exile usually imposed on the deposed. He did exile the leaders of the coup that had removed Timurburgha, and he created a new ruling council made up of his own supporters as well as experienced advisors who had fallen out of favor. Yashbak min Mahdi was appointed dawadar, or executive secretary, and Azbak min Tutkh was named atabak; the two men would remain Qaitbay's closest advisors until the ends of their careers despite their profound dislike for each other. Qaitbay would typically appoint rivals to posts of equivalent authority, thus preventing any single subordinate from acquiring too much power while he held the authority to settle any disputes himself.

=== Early reign ===
Qaitbay's first major challenge was the insurrection of Shah Suwar, leader of a small Turkmen dynasty, the Dhu'l-Qadrids, in eastern Anatolia. The first expedition against the upstart was soundly defeated, and Suwar threatened to invade Syria. A second Mamluk army under Azbak, was likewise defeated in 1469. Not until 1471 did a third expedition, this time commanded by Yashbak, succeed in routing Suwar's army. In 1473, Suwar was captured and led back to Cairo, together with his brothers; the prisoners were drawn and quartered, and their remains were hung from Bab Zuwayla.

Qaitbay's reign was also marked by trade with other contemporaneous polities. Excavations in the late 1800s and early 1900s at over fourteen sites in the vicinity of Borama in modern-day northwestern Somalia unearthed, among other things, coins identified as having been derived from Qaitbay. Most of these finds are associated with the medieval Sultanate of Adal, and were sent to the British Museum in London for preservation shortly after their discovery.

=== Consolidation of power ===
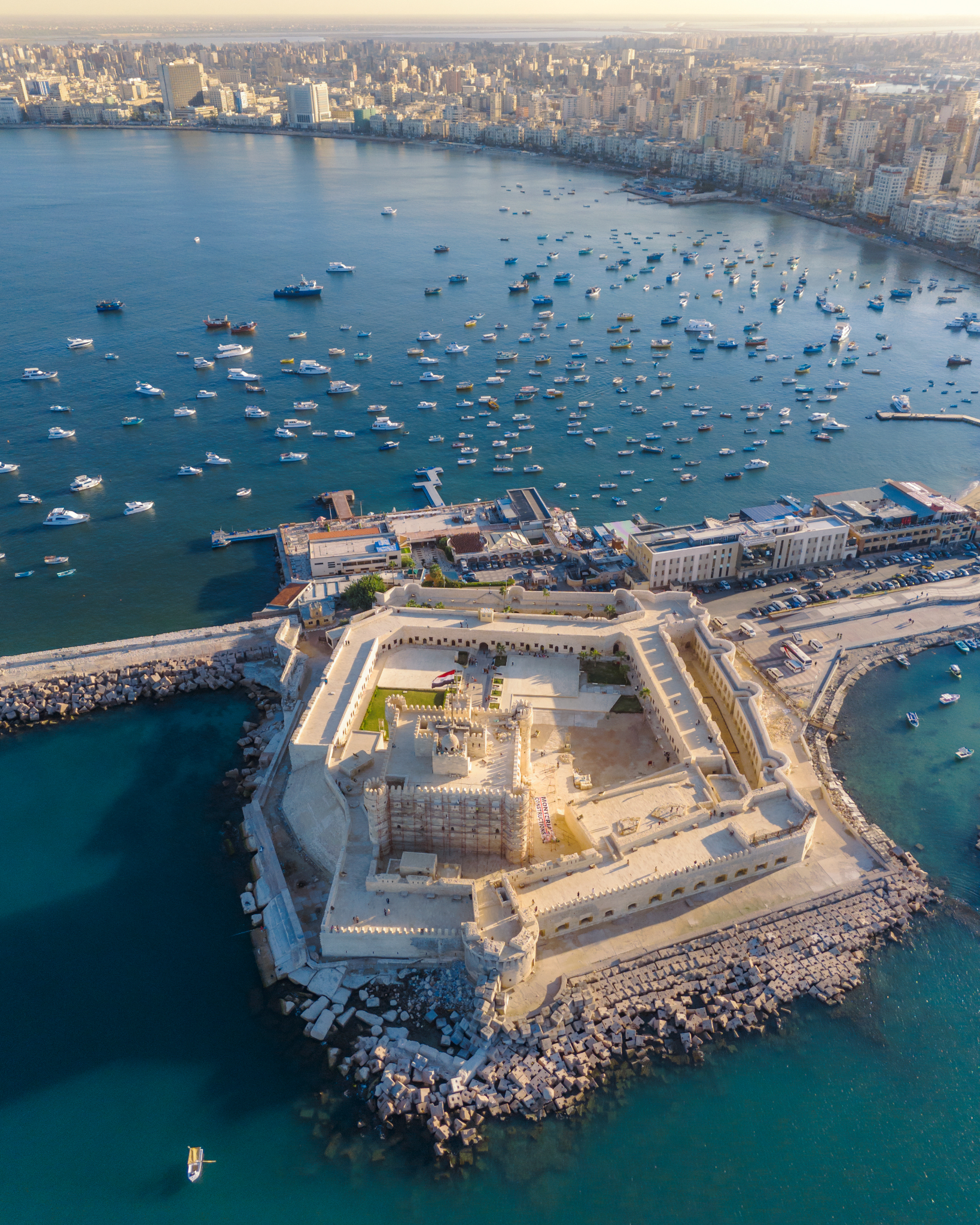
Citadel of Qaitbay in Alexandria built in 1477

Following the defeat of Suwar, Qaitbay set about purging his court of the remaining factions and installing his own purchased Mamluks in all positions of power. He frequently went on excursions, ostentatiously leaving the Citadel with limited guards to display his trust of his subordinates and of the populace. He traveled throughout his reign, visiting Alexandria, Damascus, and Aleppo, among other cities, and personally inspecting his many building projects. In 1472 he performed the Hajj to Mecca. He was struck by the poverty of the citizens of Medina and devoted a substantial portion of his private fortune to the alleviation of their plight. Through such measures Qaitbay gained a reputation for piety, charity, and royal self-confidence.

About 1480 he fortified the ruins of the Lighthouse of Alexandria that had been destroyed by an earthquake in 1323; the fort came to be called the Citadel of Qaitbay.

=== Ottoman-Mamluk war ===
In 1480 Yashbak led an army against the Aq Qoyunlu dynasty in Northern Mesopotamia, but was soundly defeated while attacking Urfa, taken prisoner, and executed. These events foreshadowed a longer military engagement with the far more powerful Ottoman Empire in Anatolia. In 1485, Ottoman armies began to campaign on the Mamluk frontier, and an expedition was dispatched from Cairo to confront them. These Mamluk troops won a surprising victory in 1486 near Adana. A temporary truce ensued, but in 1487 the Ottomans reoccupied Adana, only to be defeated once more by a massive Mamluk army. As the concomitant Ottoman expansion in the western Mediterranean represented an increased threat to the Catholic Monarchs of Spain, Ferdinand II of Aragon made a temporary alliance with the Mamluks against the Ottomans from 1488 until 1491, shipping wheat and offering a fleet of 50 caravels against the Ottomans.

In 1491, a final truce was signed that would last through the remaining reigns of Qaitbay and the Ottoman Sultan Bayezid II. Qaitbay's ability to enforce a peace with the greatest military power in the Muslim world further enhanced his prestige at home and abroad.

=== Final years ===
The end of Qaitbay's reign was marred by increasing unrest among his troops and a decline in his personal health, including a riding accident that left him comatose for days. Many of his most trusted officials died, and were replaced by far less scrupulous upstarts; a long period of palace intrigue ensued. In 1492, the plague returned to Cairo, and was reported to have claimed 200,000 lives. Qaitbay's health became markedly poor in 1494, and his court, now lacking a figure of central authority, was wracked by infighting, factionalism, and purges.

He died on 8 August 1496 and was interred in the spectacular mausoleum attached to his mosque in Cairo's Northern Cemetery, which he had built during his lifetime. He was succeeded by his son, an-Nasir Muhammad (not to be confused with the famed 14th-century sultan of the same name).

== Family ==
One of his wives was the daughter of Sultan Sayf ad-Din Inal. Another consort was Khawand Aṣalbāy, a Circassian, who was his slave concubine rather than his wife, and sister of Sultan Abu Sa'id Qansuh. She was the mother of his son, Sultan Sultan An-Nasir Muhammad. After Qaitbay's death, she married Sultan Al-Ashraf Janbalat. Another wife was Khawand Fatima, the daughter of Ala al-Din Ali bin Ali bin Al-Khassbak. She was the mother of Ahmed (1462–1468) and Sitt al-Jarakisa (1464–1468). After Qaitbay's death, she married Sultans Tuman bay I and Al-Ashraf Qansuh al-Ghuri. She died on 6 June 1504. Another wife was Khawand Zaynab.

== Legacy ==
Qaitbay's reign has traditionally been seen as the "happy culmination" of the Burji Mamluk dynasty. It was a period of unparalleled political stability, military success, and prosperity, and Qaitbay's contemporaries admired him as a defender of traditional Mamluk values. At the same time, he may be criticized for his conservatism, and for his failure to innovate in the face of new challenges. Following Qaitbay's death, the Mamluk state descended into a prolonged succession crisis lasting for five years until the accession of Al-Ashraf Qansuh al-Ghawri.

=== Architectural patronage ===
Qaitbay is perhaps best known for his wide-ranging architectural patronage, which was second only to al-Nasir Muhammad ibn Qalawun. At least 230 monuments, either surviving or mentioned in contemporary sources, are associated with his reign. In Egypt, Qaitbay's buildings are found throughout Cairo, as well as in Alexandria and Rosetta; in Syria he sponsored projects in Aleppo and Damascus; in addition, he was responsible for the construction of madrasas and fountains in Jerusalem and Gaza, which still stand – most notably the Fountain (sabil) of Qayt Bay and al-Ashrafiyya Madrasa. On the Arabian peninsula, Qaitbay sponsored the restoration of mosques and the construction of madrasas, fountains and hostels n Mecca and Medina – most notably the Madrasa of Qaitbay and its minaret in Mecca built in 1477–80. After a serious fire struck the Mosque of the Prophet in Medina in 1481, the building, including the Tomb of the Prophet, was extensively renewed through Qaitbay's patronage.

Monuments attributed to Qaitbay

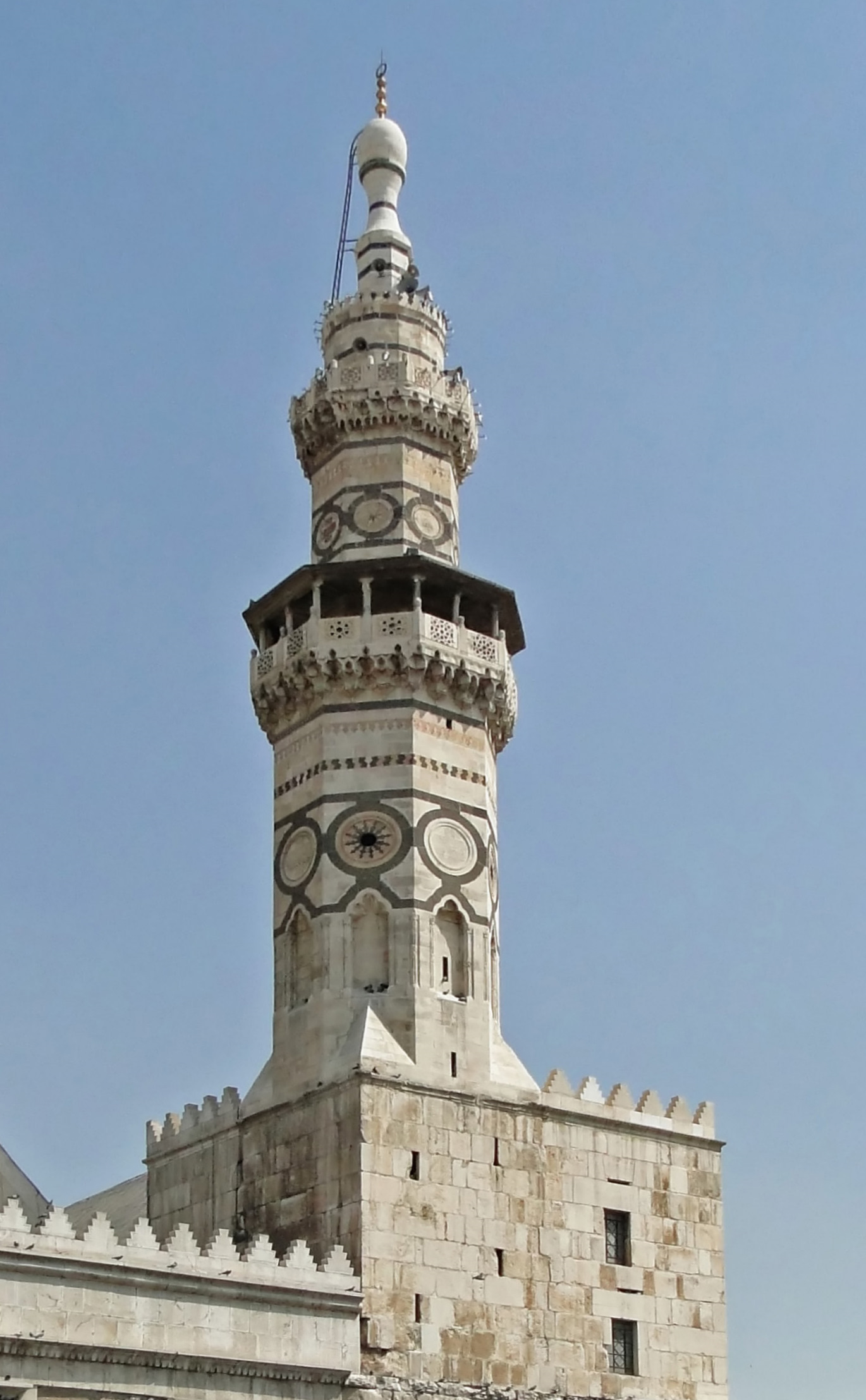
Minaret of Qaitbay, Umayyad Mosque, in Damascus

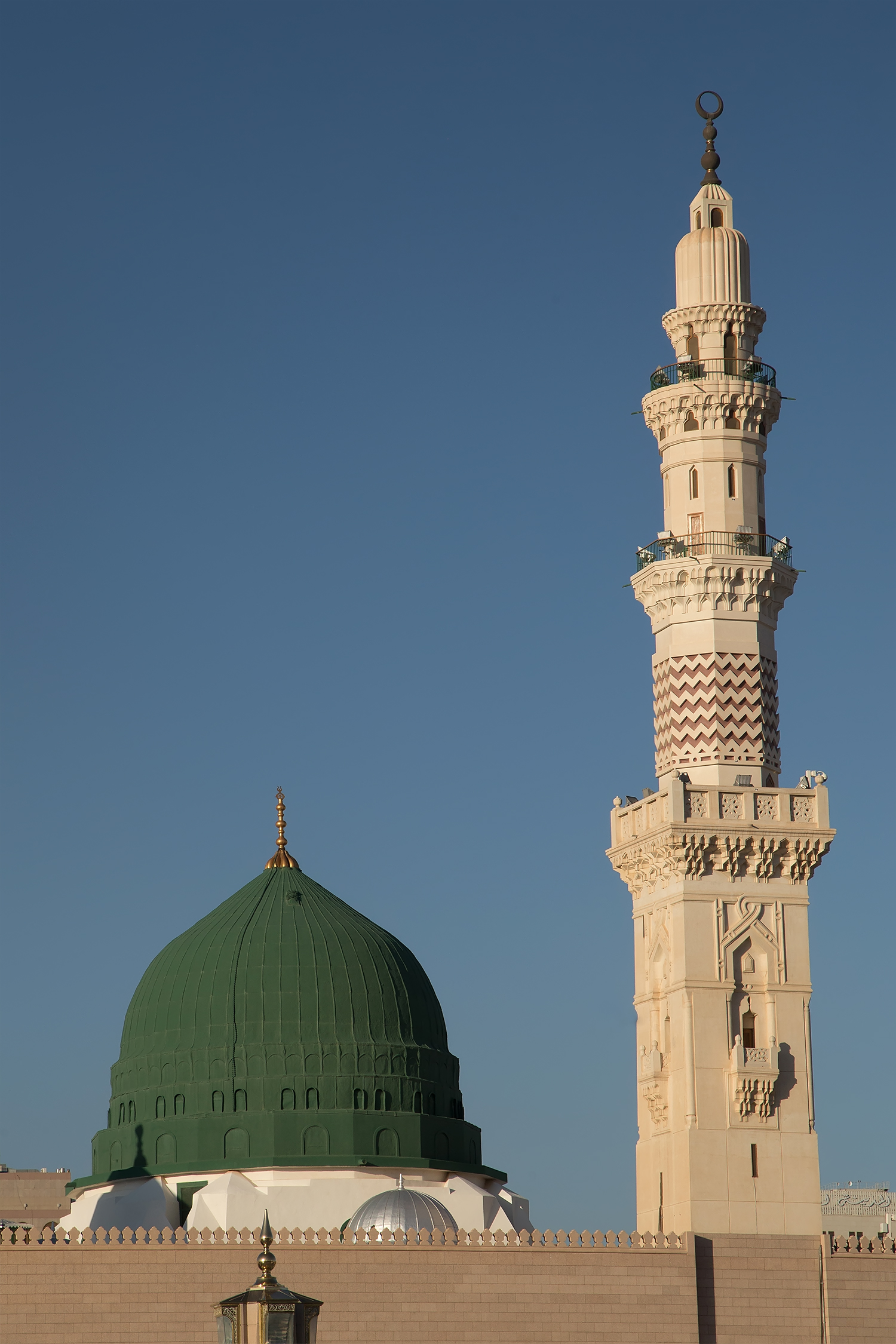
Raisiyya ("Main") Minaret of the Prophet's Mosque built by Qaitbay in Medina

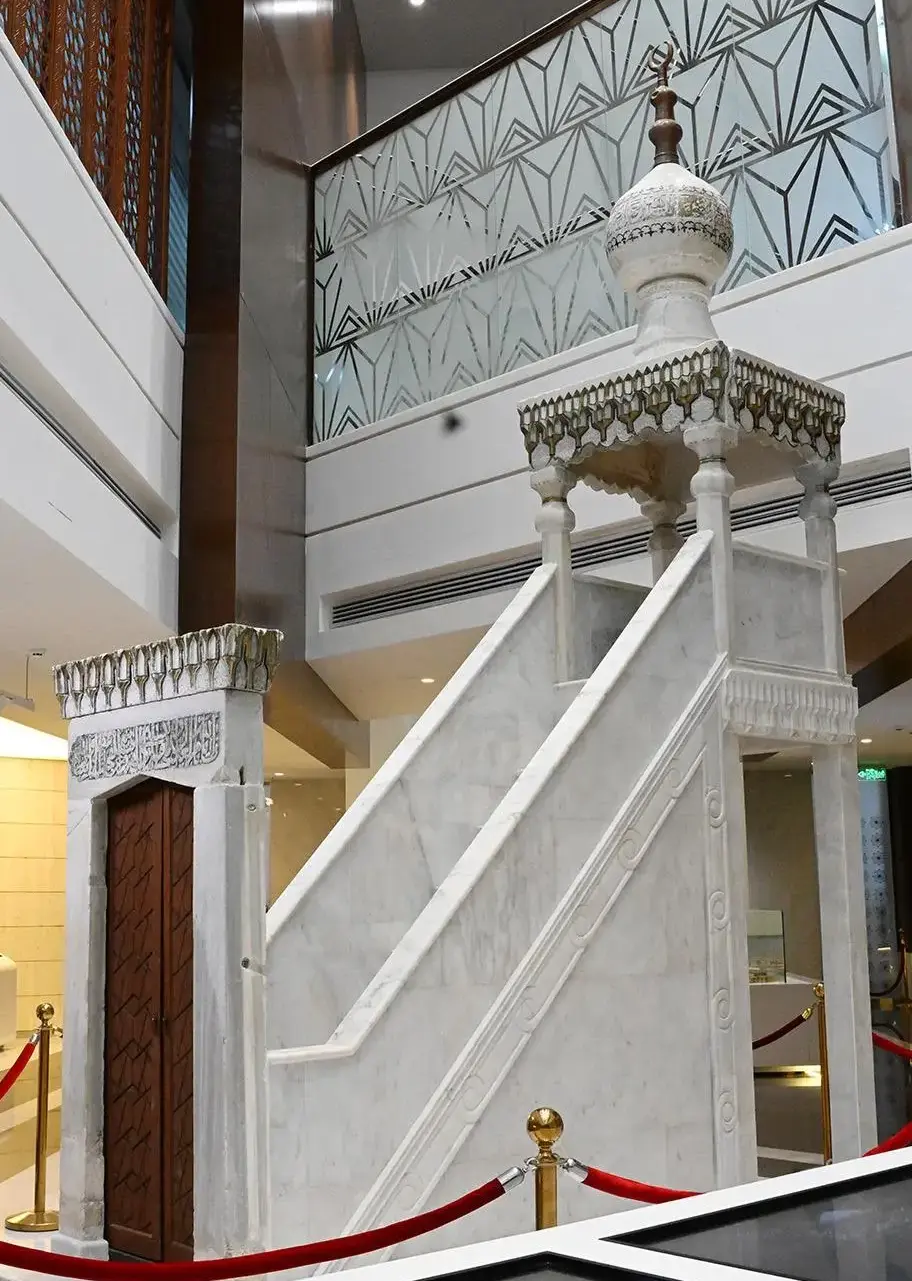
Minbar of Qaitbay, was the minbar of the Prophet's Mosque between 1483–1590

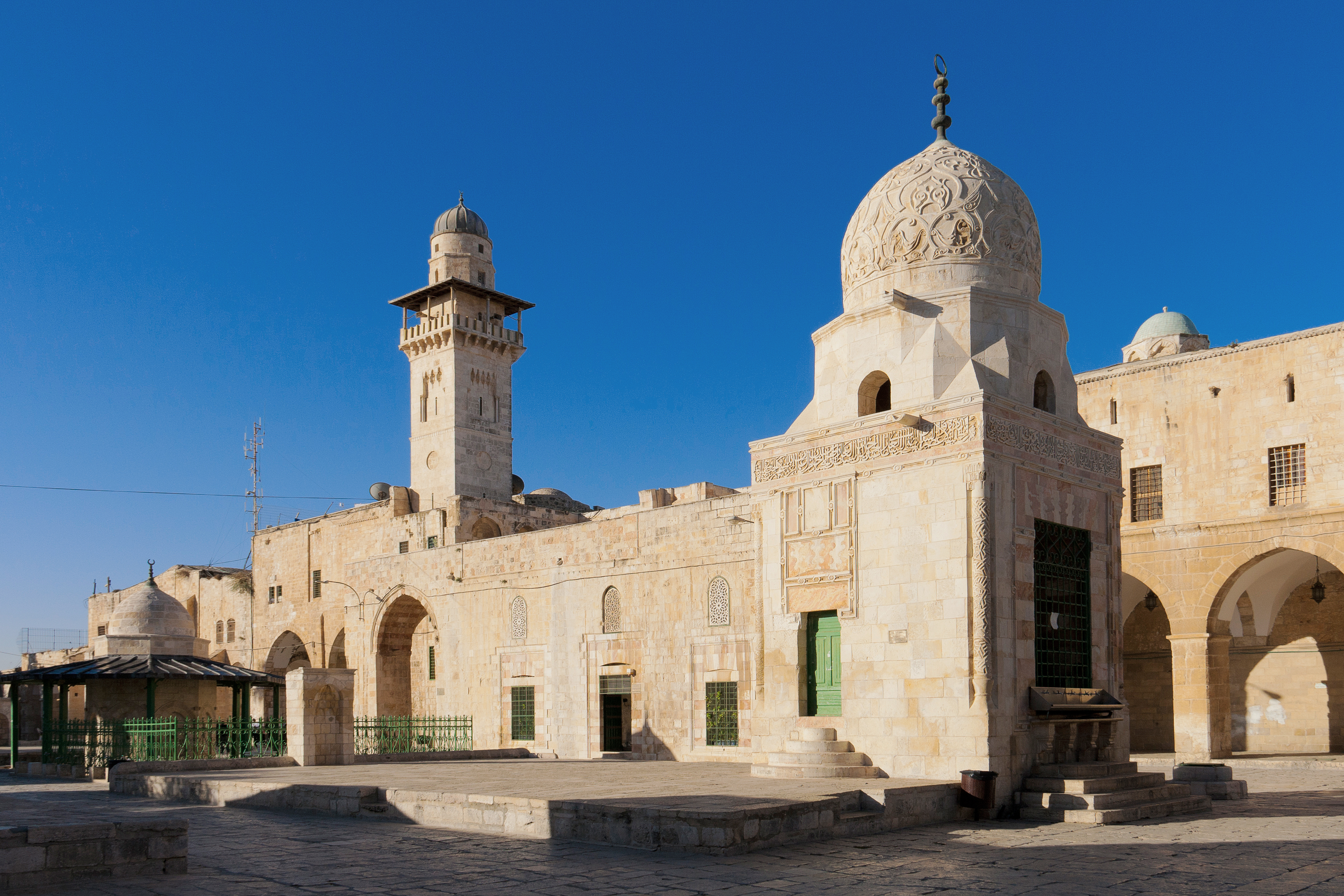
Fountain of Qaitbay and the Madrasa al-Ashrafiyya in Al-Aqsa, Jerusalem

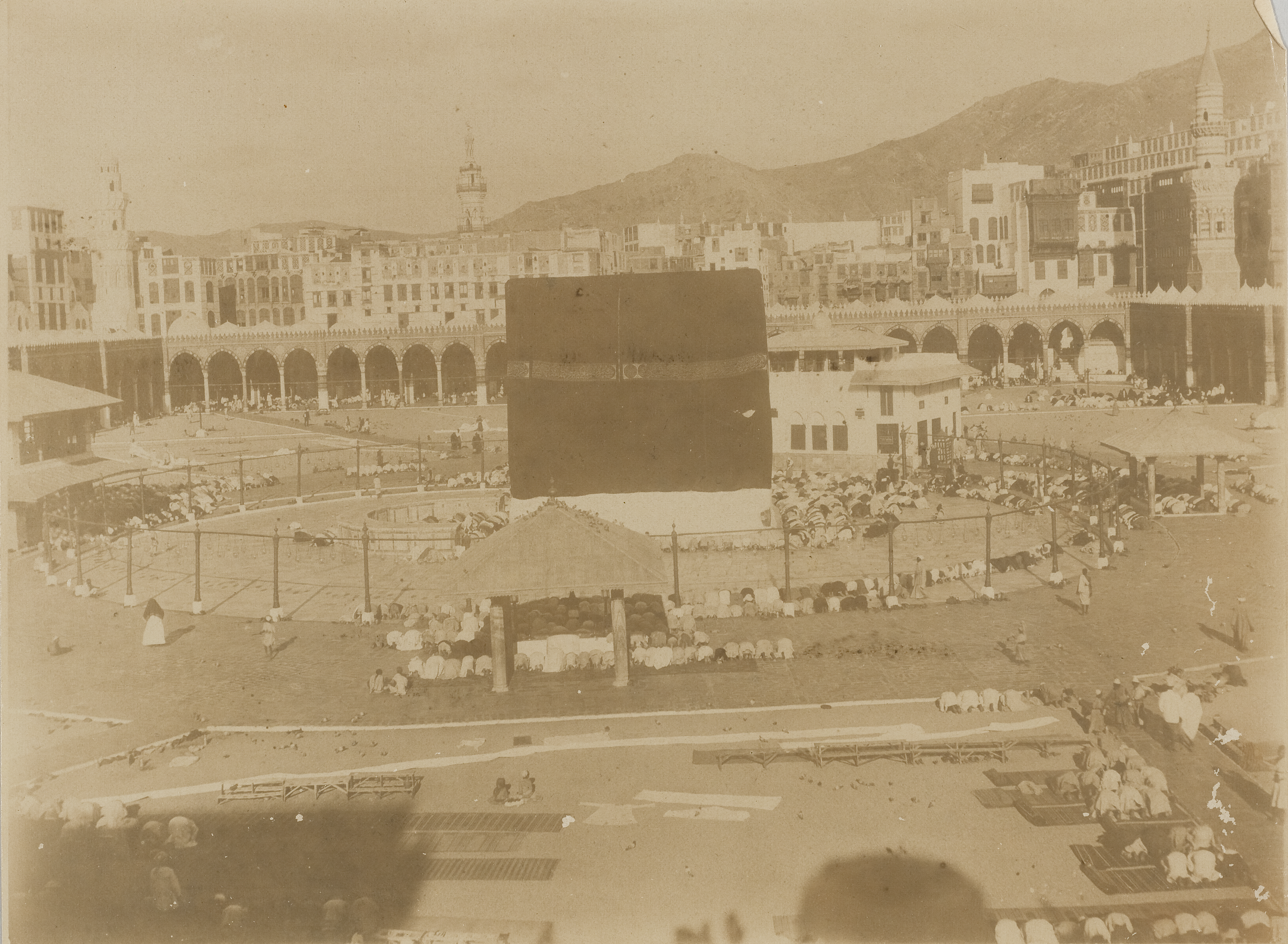
The Minaret of Qaitbay, behind the Kaaba, stood adjacent to Masjid al-Haram until its demolition during the mosque's expansions

One of Qaytbay's largest building projects in Cairo was his funerary complex in the Northern Cemetery, which included his mausoleum, a mosque/madrasa, a maq'ad (reception hall), and various auxiliary structures and functions attached to it. It is considered a masterpiece of late Mamluk architecture and is featured today on Egypt's 1 pound note. His other contributions in Cairo include a Wikala at Bab al-Nasr, a Wikala-Sabil-Kuttab near al-Azhar Mosque, a Sabil-Kuttab on Saliba Street, a madrasa-mosque at Qal'at al-Kabsh, a mosque on Roda Island, and a palace that is now incorporated into the Bayt al-Razzaz palace. Other amirs and patrons also built notable projects under his reign, such as the Mosque of Amir Qijmas al-Ishaqi, which feature the same refined architectural style of his time. In Alexandria, he built a large fortress on the site of the ruined Pharos Lighthouse.

Monuments attributed to Qaitbay in Cairo

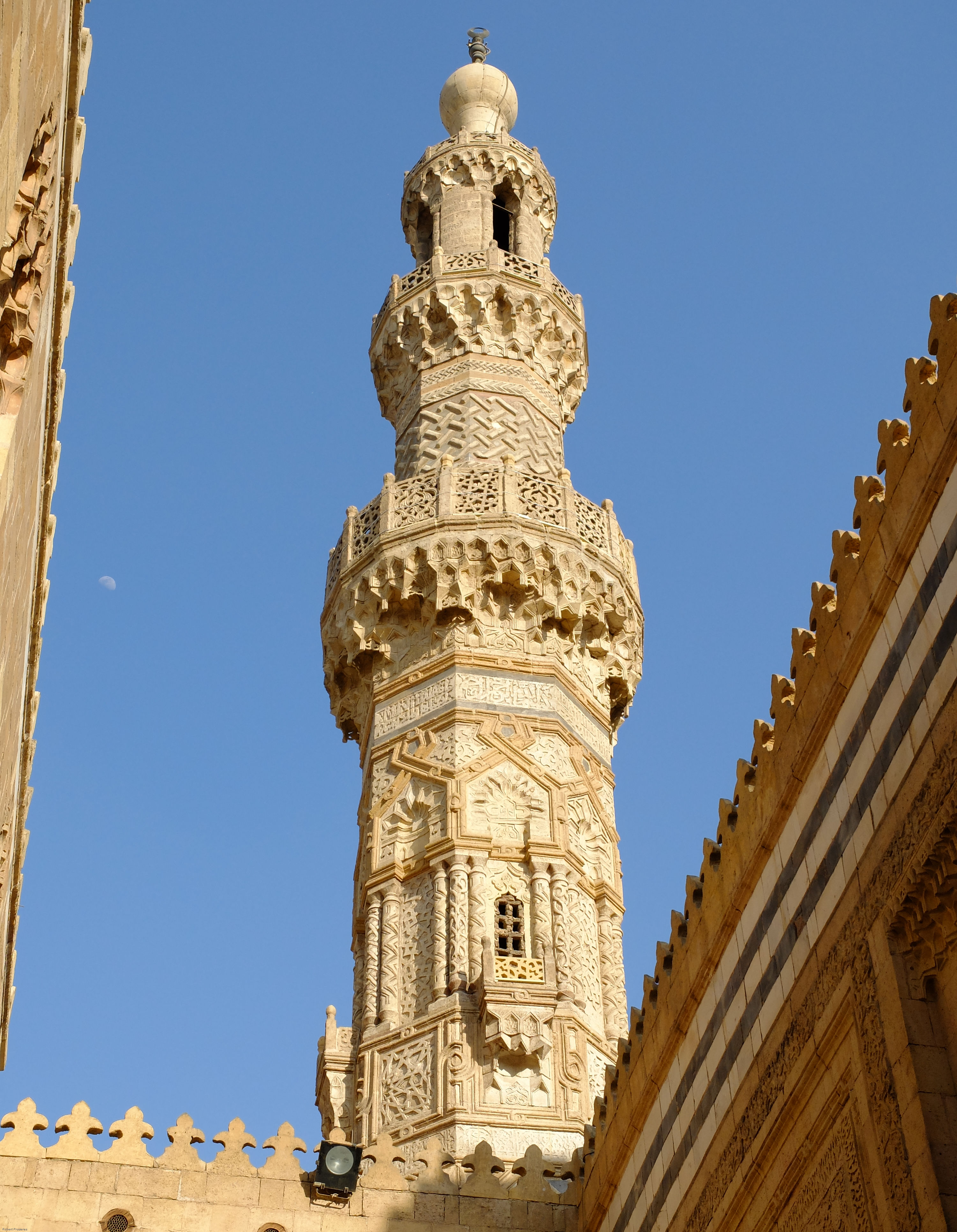
Minaret of Qaitbay, viewed from Qaitbay’s entrance in Al-Azhar Mosque

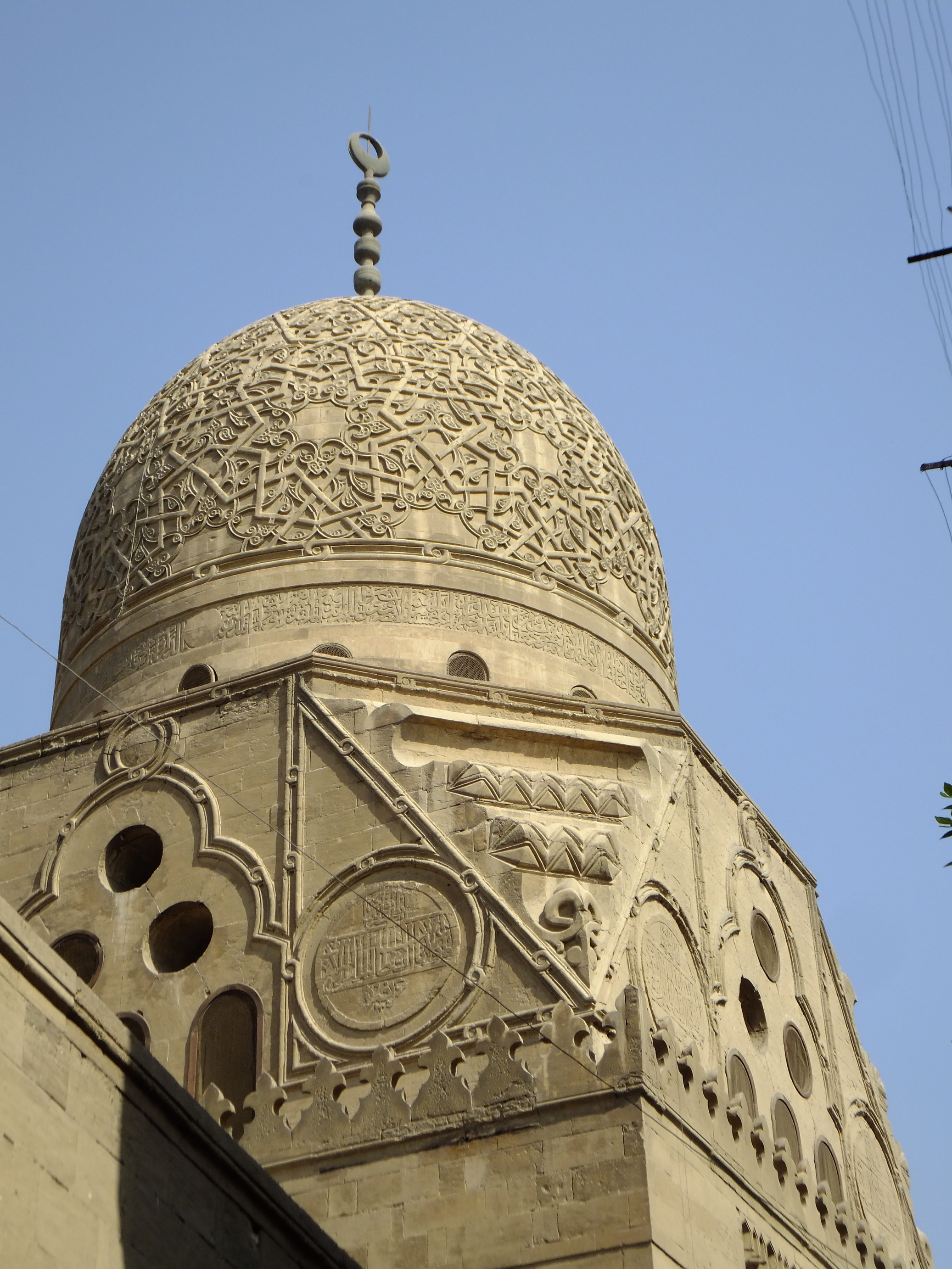
The dome of Qaitbay's mausoleum and mosque in Cairo's Northern Cemetery

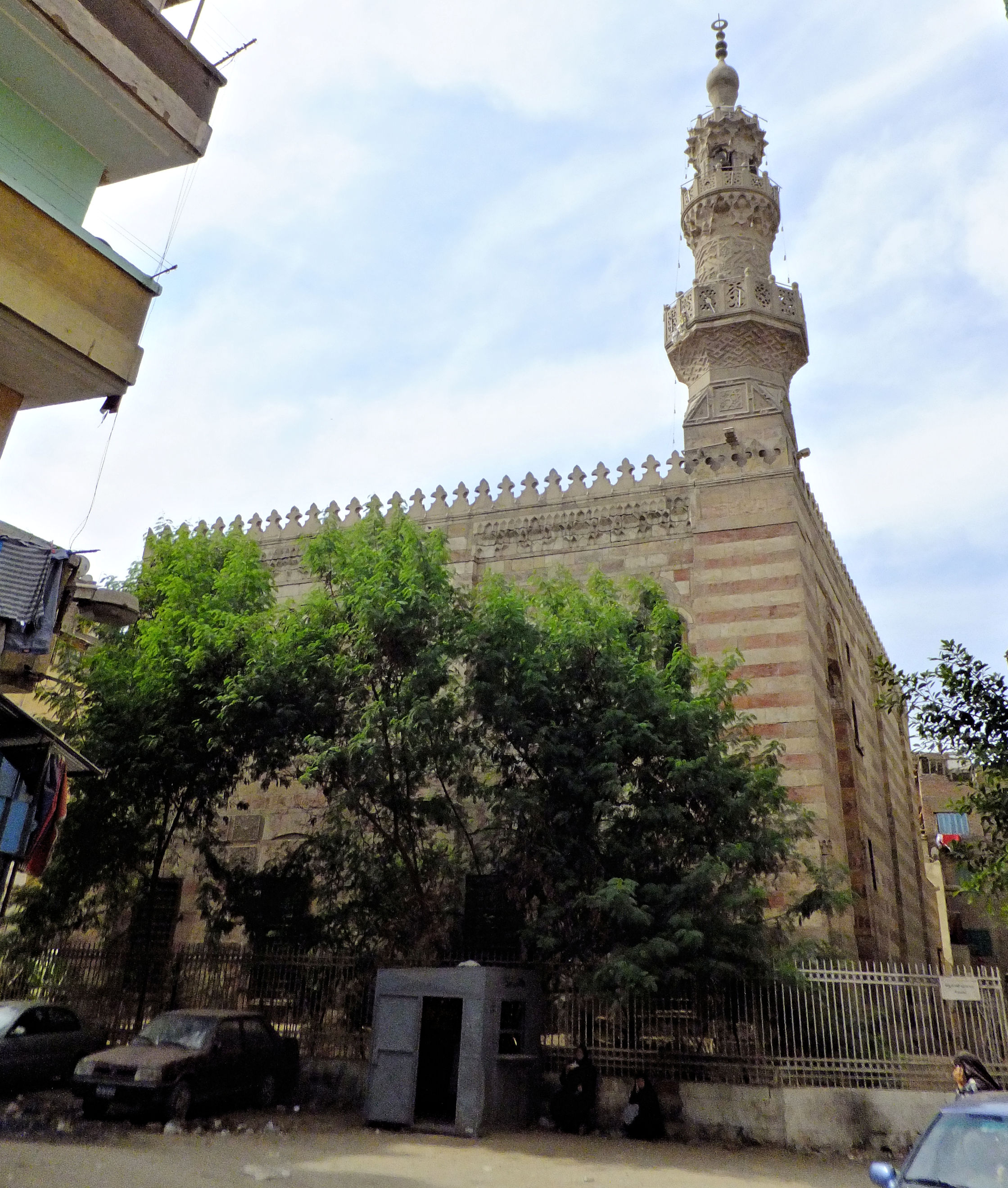
Mosque of Qaytbay in the Qal'at al-Kabsh neighbourhood of Cairo

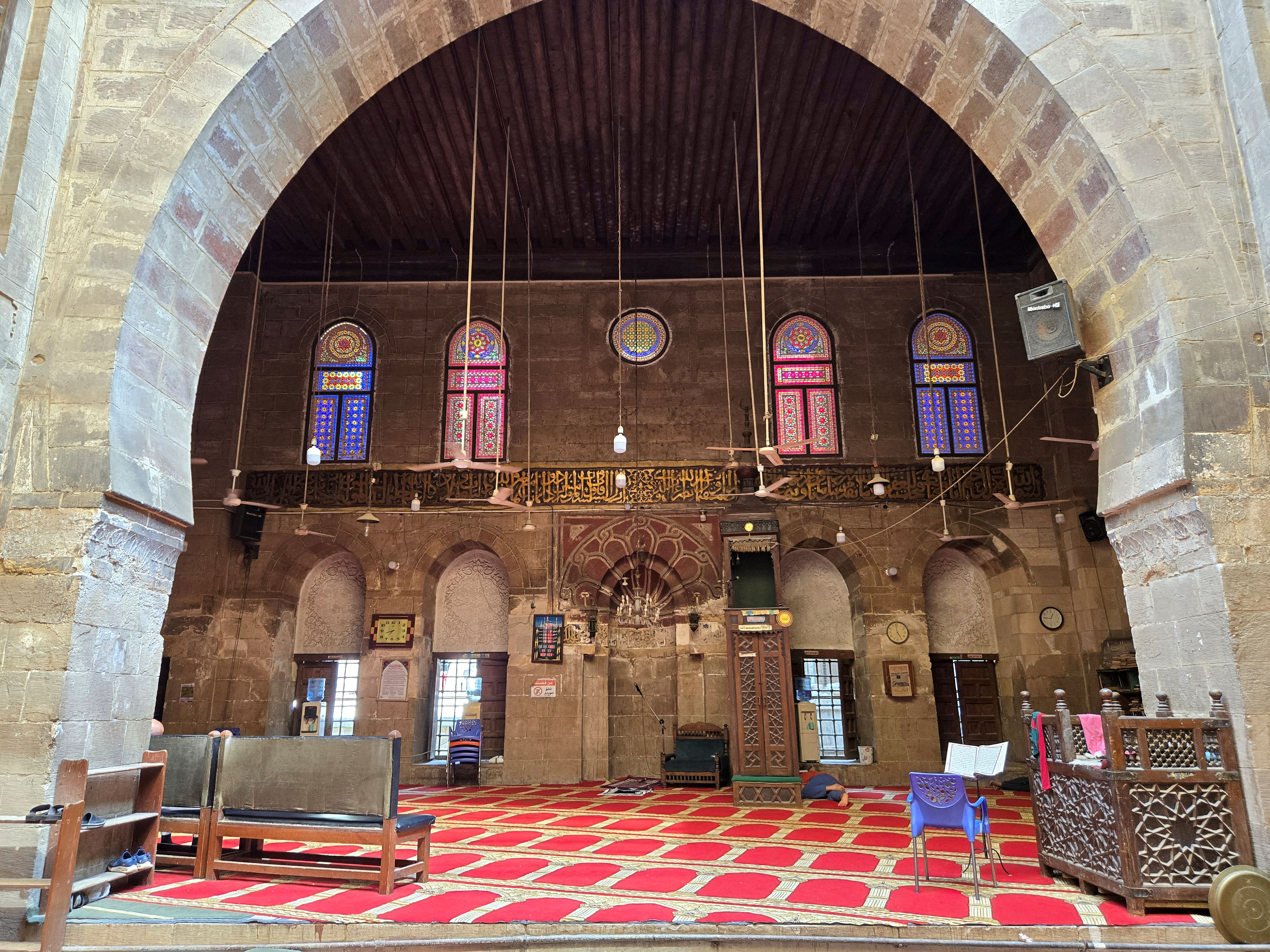
Mosque of Qaytbay on Roda Island

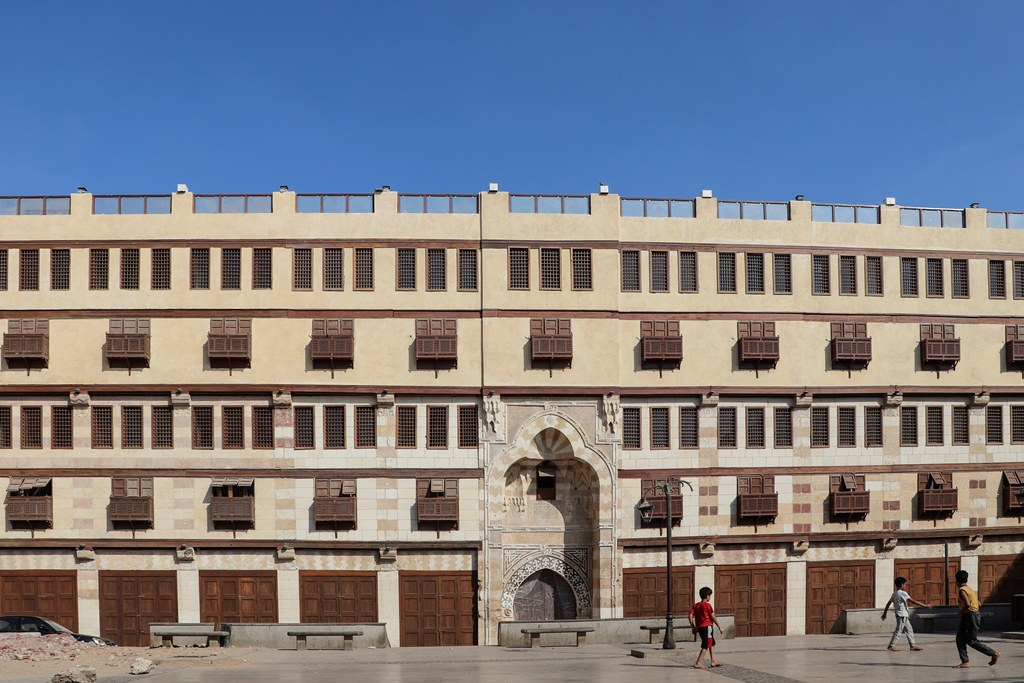
Wikala of Sultan Qaitbay next to Bab al-Nasr

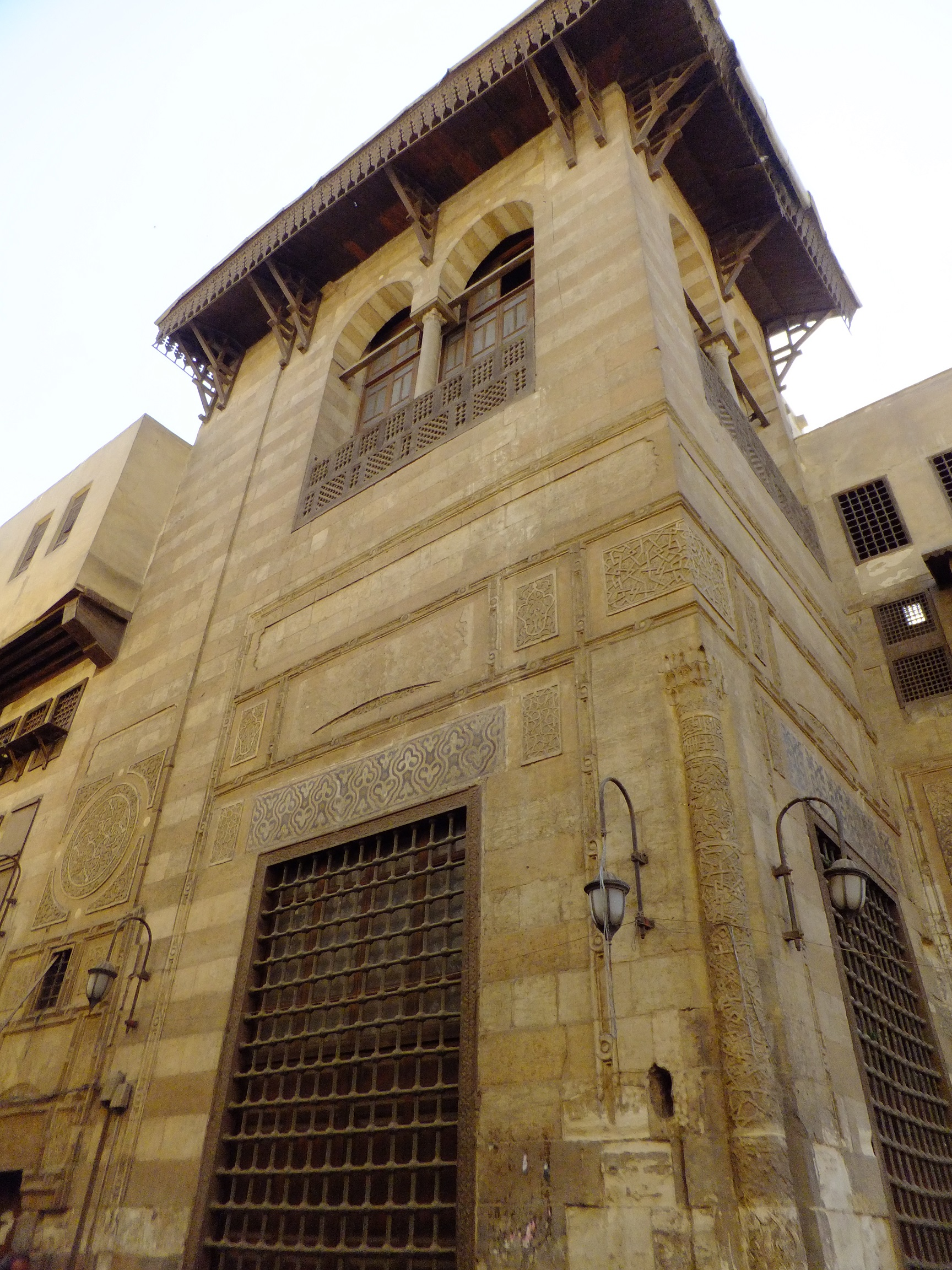
Wikala and Sabil-Kuttab of Sultan Qaitbay near Al-Azhar Mosque

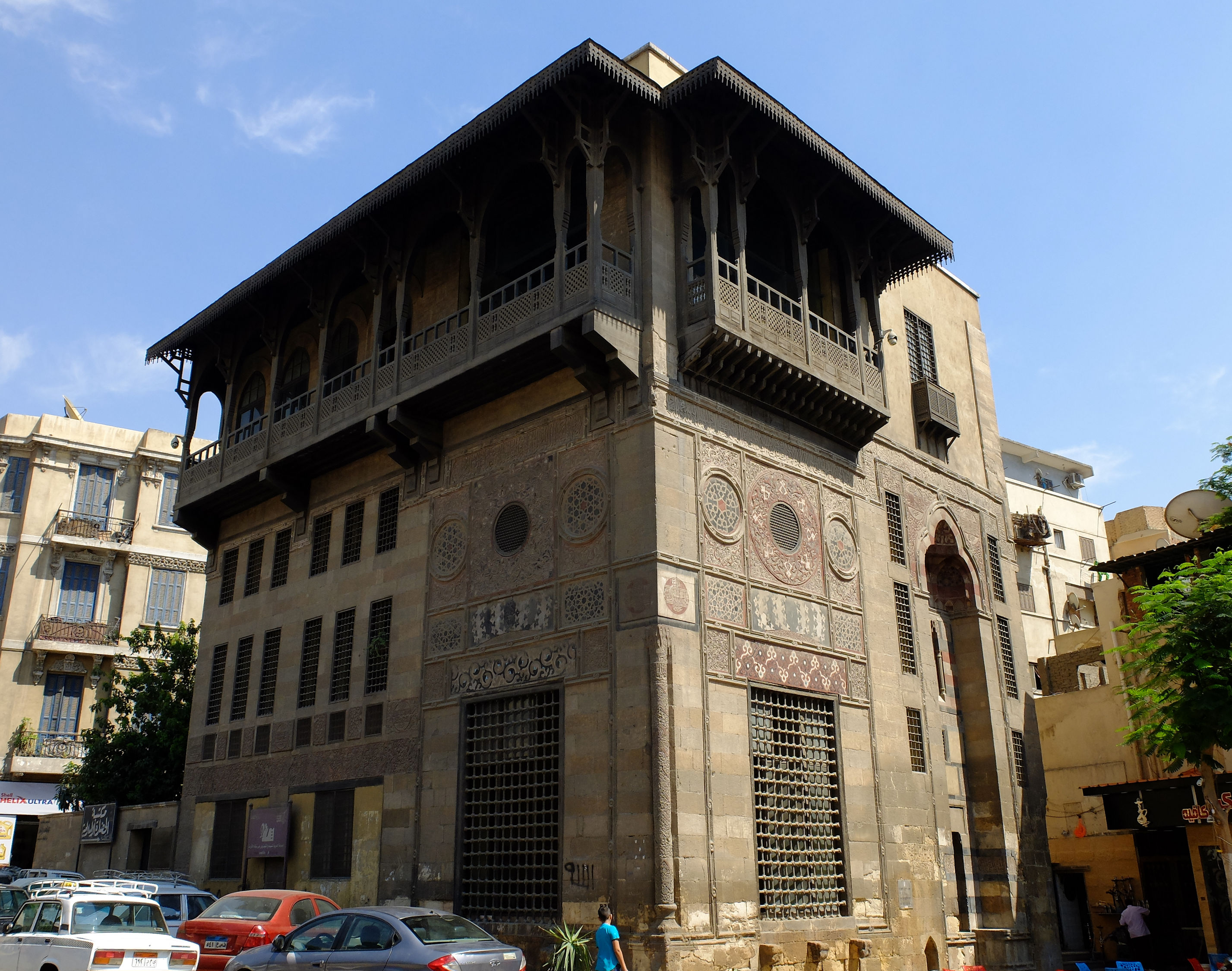
Sabil-Kuttab of Qaitbay on Saliba Street

=== In Ethiopic sources ===
Qaitbay is mentioned in Ethiopic sources as አሽሪፍ (Ashrif) and እልአሽሪፍ (El-Ashrif) a cruel ruler who destroyed the famous church of Dayr al-Magtas (ደብረ ምጥማቅ). Hearing the news of the church's destruction the Ethiopian ruler Zara Yaqob built another church in Ethiopia to console the sorrow of the Egyptian bishop Michael who served in the church before he was sent to Ethiopia by the Coptic Patriarchate. The Ethiopic source accurately describes the political instability of Qaitbay's rule in the final days.

== Sources ==
- Stefano Carboni, Venice and the Islamic World, 828–1797 (New Haven, 2007).
- J.-C. Garcin, "The regime of the Circassian Mamluks," in C.F. Petry, ed., The Cambridge History of Egypt I: Islamic Egypt, 640–1517 (Cambridge, 1998), 290–317.
- Meinecke, M. (1992). Die mamlukische Architektur in Ägypten und Syrien (648/1250 bis 923/1517). Glückstadt. ISBN 387030071X.
- A. W. Newhall, The patronage of the Mamluk Sultan Qā’it Bay, 872–901/1468–1496 (Diss. Harvard, 1987).
- Petry, C. F. (1993). Twilight of Majesty: the reigns of the Mamlūk Sultans al-Ashrāf Qāytbāy and Qānṣūh al-Ghawrī in Egypt. Seattle: University of Washington Press. pp. 36–43. ISBN 9780295973074.
- Raymond, A. (2000). Cairo. Harvard University Press. ISBN 0674003160.
