= List of historic monuments in Cairo =

The historic monuments of Cairo have been listed in several iterations dating back to the late nineteenth century that were produced by the Comité de Conservation des Monuments de l'Art Arabe (Arabic: لجنت حفظ الاثار العربية, romanized: Lajnat ḥifẓ al-athār al-ʿarabiyya) which was succeeded by the Egyptian Antiquities Organization (which is now the Supreme Council of Antiquities).

== Maps ==
There were several maps published by related governmental authorities detailing the location of registered historic monuments that were color coded according to the period of their foundation. The first large scale map was published in 1924 by the Survey of Egypt. A second map was published in 1927. Another map was published in 1948, both in Arabic and in English. This last map of "Mohammadan Monuments of Cairo" is perhaps the best known.

Map of Mohammadan Monuments of Cairo 1948 (Arabic)
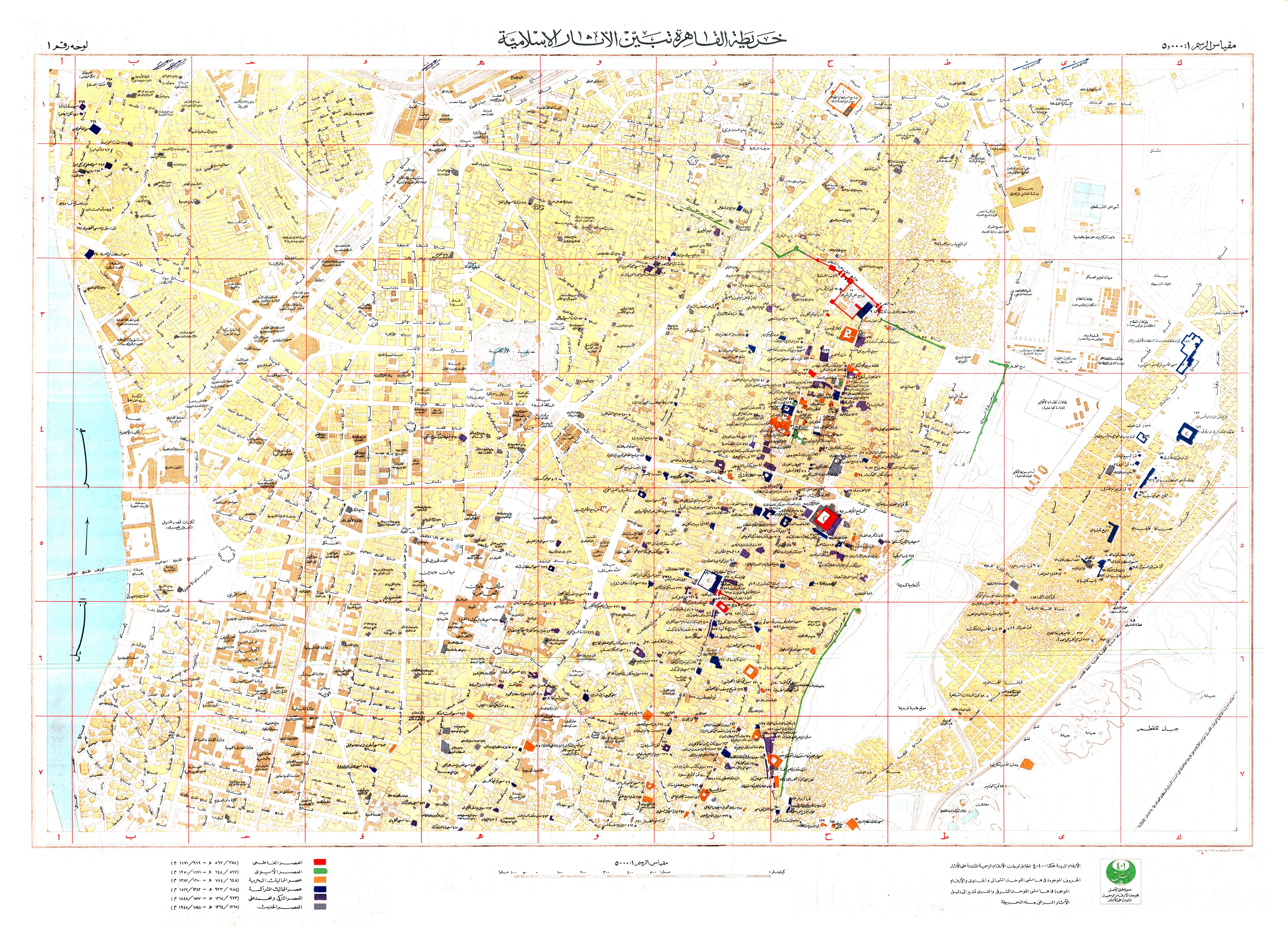
Northern Half of Cairo

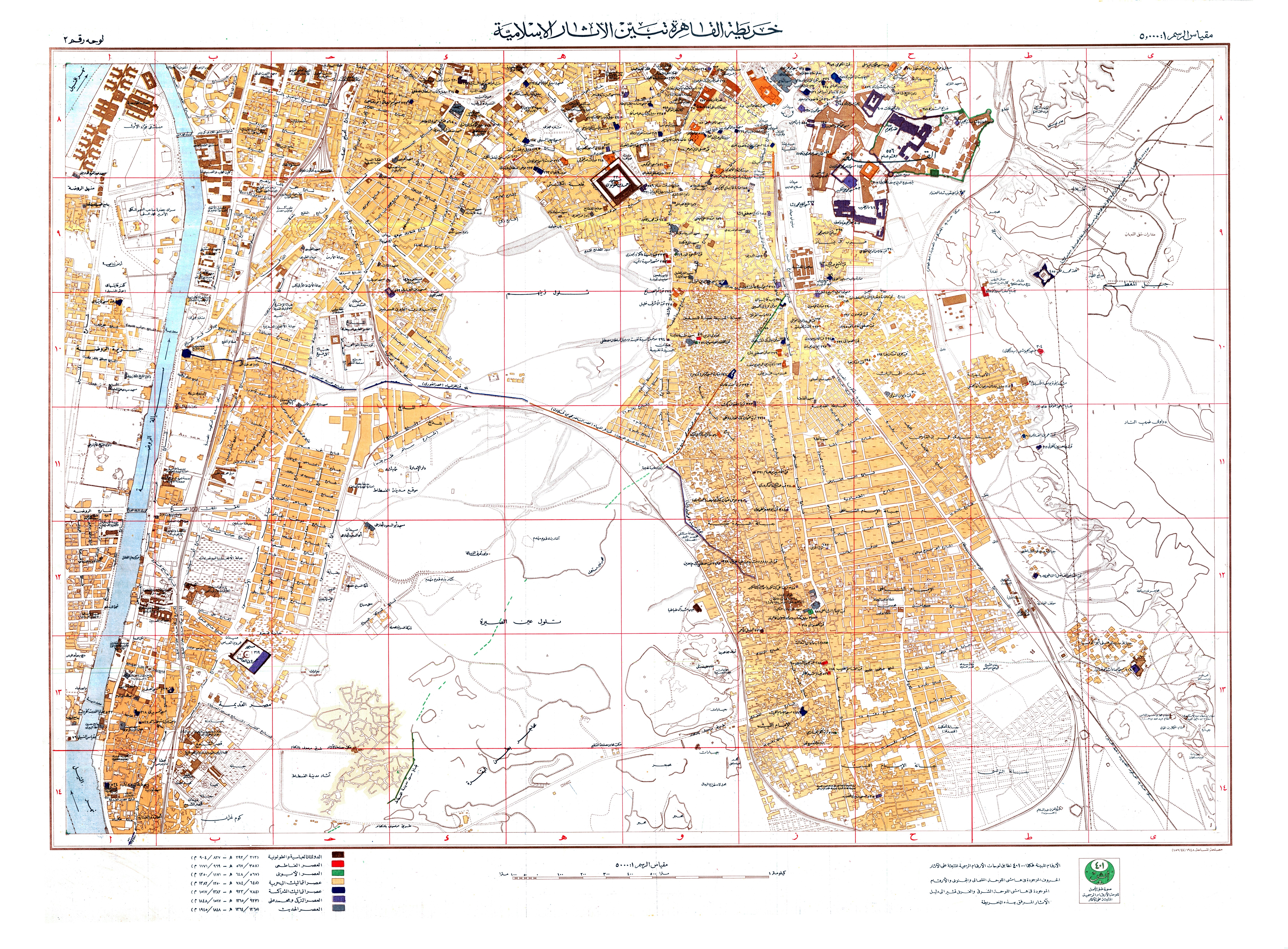
Southern Half of Cairo

== List of monuments ==
Monument number (athar raqam)	Monument	Period
3	Mausoleum and minaret of Abu’l Ghadanfar	Burji Mamluk
6	Bab al-Futuh	Fatimid
7	Bab al-Nasr	Fatimid
9	Wikala of Qaytbay	Burji Mamluk
10	Mausoleum of Ahmad al-Qasid	Bahri Mamluk
11	Wikala of Qawsun	Bahri Mamluk
13	House in the waqf of al-Hatu	Ottoman
14	Sabil-kuttab of the amir Muhammad	Ottoman
15	Mosque of al-Hakim	Fatimid
16	Sabil-kuttab of Qitas Bey	Ottoman
17	Sabil-kuttab of Udah Basha	Ottoman
18	Mosque of al-Bakri	Bahri Mamluk
19	Wikala of Dhulfiqar (Udah Basha)	Ottoman
20	Palace al-Musafirkhana	Ottoman
21	Sabil-kuttab of ‘Abd al-Rahman Katkhuda	Ottoman
22	Mosque of Aydumur al-Bahlawan	Bahri Mamluk
23	Sabil-kuttab of al-Sayyid ‘Ali ibn Hayz‘	Ottoman
24	Mosque of Almalik al-Gukandar	Bahri Mamluk
25	Mosque of Bardbak	Burji Mamluk
26	Mosque of Mughaltay al-Gamali	Bahri Mamluk
27	Sabil of al-Bazdar	Ottoman
28	Gateway and minaret of the mosque of al-Husayn	Ayyubid
29	Mosque of Marzuq al-Ahmadi	Ottoman
30	Mosque of Mahmud Muharram	Ottoman
31	Mausoleum of Qarasunqur	Bahri Mamluk
32	Khanqah of Baybars al-Jashankir	Bahri Mamluk
33	Mosque of al-Aqmar	Fatimid
34	Palace of Bashtak	Bahri Mamluk
35	Madrasa of Gamal al-Din al-Ustadar	Burji Mamluk
36	Mausoleum and mosque of Tatar al-Hegaziya	Bahri Mamluk
37	Remains of the madrasa of al-Zahir Baybars	Bahri Mamluk
38	Mausoleum and madrasa of Salih Negm al-Din Ayyub	Ayyubid
39	Mihrab of the mosque of Badr al-Din al-‘Agami	Bahri Mamluk
40	Mosque and sabil-kuttab of Shaykh ‘Ali al-Mutahhar	Ottoman
41	Tomb of Shaykh Sinan	Ottoman
42	Mosque of Taghribardi	Burji Mamluk
43	Complex of Qalawun	Bahri Mamluk
44	Complex of al-Nasir Muhammad	Bahri Mamluk
45	Mosque of Mithqal	Bahri Mamluk
46	Façade of the mosque of ‘Abd al-Latif al-Qarafi	Ottoman
47	Bab Qadi ‘Askar	Bahri Mamluk
48	Mosque of Muhib al-Din Abu’l Tayyib	Ottoman
49	Mosque of Abu Bakr ibn Muzhir	Burji Mamluk
50	Qa‘a of Muhib al-Din al-Muwaqqi	Bahri Mamluk
51	Maq‘ad of Mamay al-Sa‘ifi	Burji Mamluk
52	Sabil-kuttab of Khusraw Pasha	Ottoman
53	Bab al-Badistan al-Ghuri	Burji Mamluk
54	Façade of the wikala of al-Ghuri (al-Qutn)	Burji Mamluk
56	Bab al-Ghuri	Burji Mamluk
57	Sabil-kuttab of Isma‘il ibn Ahmad (al-Maghlawi / al-Manawi)	Ottoman
58	Façade of the zawiya of Fatima Umm Khawand	Burji Mamluk
59	Mausoleum of al-Sha‘rani	Burji Mamluk
60	Mosque of Qadi ‘Abd al-Basit	Burji Mamluk
61	Ribat of the wife of Sultan Inal	Burji Mamluk
62	Hawd and sabil of Muhammad Bey Abu’l Dhahab	Ottoman
63	Qa‘a and maq‘ad in the waqf al-Sha‘rani	Ottoman
64	Wikalat al-Ghuri	Burji Mamluk
65	House in the waqf of Sa‘id Pasha	Burji Mamluk
66	Maq‘ad of al-Ghuri	Burji Mamluk
67	Mausoleum and sabil-kuttab of al-Ghuri	Burji Mamluk
68	Tomb of Muhammad al-Anwar	Ottoman
69	Sabil-kuttab of Zayn al-Abidin	Ottoman
70	Sabil-kuttab of Sulayman Bey al-Kharbutli	Ottoman
71	Sabil-kuttab of Khalil Effendi al-Muqati’gui	Ottoman
72	House of Gamal al-Din al-Dhahabi	Ottoman
73	Sabil-kuttab of Abu’l Iqbal ‘Arifin Bey	Ottoman
74	Hawd of Qaytbay	Burji Mamluk
75	Wikala of Qaytbay	Burji Mamluk
76	Sabil-kuttab of Qaytbay	Burji Mamluk
77	House in the waqf of Zaynab Khatun	Burji Mamluk & Ottoman
96	Madrasat al-Ghanamiya	Bahri Mamluk
97	Mosque of al-Azhar	Fatimid
98	Mosque of Muhammad Bey Abu’l Dhahab	Ottoman
102	Mosque of al-Ayni	Burji Mamluk
103	Zawiya of Ahmad ibn Sha’ban	
105	Mausoleum of Sudun al-Qasrawi	Burji Mamluk
107	Mosque of Kafur al-Zimam	Burji Mamluk
109	Mosque of al-Fakahani and Fatimid doors	Fatimid
112	Mosque of Aslam al-Silahdar	Bahri Mamluk
113	Tomb of Azdumur	Burji Mamluk
114	Mosque of Qagmas al-Ishaqi	Burji Mamluk
115	Mosque of Ahmad al-Mihmandar	Bahri Mamluk
116	Mosque of al-Salih Tala’i‘	Fatimid
117	Mosque of Mahmud al-Kurdi	Bahri Mamluk
118	Mosque of Inal al-Yusufi	Burji Mamluk
119	Mosque of Ganibak	Burji Mamluk
120	Mosque of al-Maridani	Bahri Mamluk
123	Mosque of Aqsunqur	Bahri Mamluk
125	Madrasa of Umm al-Sultan Sha'ban	Bahri Mamluk
126	Mosque of Alti Barmaq	Ottoman
127	Mosque of Sudun Min Zada	Burji Mamluk
128	Qubba of al-Qimari	Bahri Mamluk
129	Mosque and mausoleum of Ganem al-Bahlawan	Burji Mamluk
130	Mosque of Ulmas	Bahri Mamluk
131	Mosque of Ulgay al-Yusufi	Bahri Mamluk
133	Madrasa of Sultan Hasan	Bahri Mamluk
134	Madrasa of Gawhar al-Lala	Burji Mamluk
135	Mosque al-Mahmudiya	Ottoman
136	Mosque of Qanibay al-Sayfi (Amir Akhur)	Burji Mamluk
137	Mosque of al-Sukkari	Ottoman
138	Mosque of Mangak al-Yusufi	Bahri Mamluk
139	Mausoleum of Yunus al-Dawadar	Burji Mamluk
140	Khanqah of Nizam al-Din	Bahri Mamluk
141	Ribat of al-Zayni	Burji Mamluk
142	Mosque of Sulayman Pasha	Ottoman
143	Mosque of al-Nasir Muhammad	Bahri Mamluk
144	Sabil of Shaykhu	Bahri Mamluk
145	Mosque of Ahmad Katkhuda al-‘Azab	Ottoman
146	Zawiyat al-‘Abbar	Bahri Mamluk
147	Mosque of Shaykhu	Bahri Mamluk
148	Mosque of al-Ghuri	Burji Mamluk
150	Sabil-kuttab of Muhammad Katkhuda Mustahfizan	Ottoman
151	Mosque of Qanibay al-Muhammadi	Burji Mamluk
152	Khanqah of Shaykhu	Bahri Mamluk
153	Mosque of Kushqadam al-Ahmadi	Bahri Mamluk & Burji Mamluk
154	Minaret of Qanibay al-Sharkasi	Burji Mamluk
155	Zawiya of Mustafa Pasha	Ottoman
156	Minaret of the mosque of al-Baqli	Bahri Mamluk
159	Minaret of the mosque of al-Ghuri	
160	Mosque of Messih Pasha	Ottoman
167	Sabil-kuttab of Sulayman Gawish	Ottoman
169	Mausoleum of Shagarat al-Durr	Bahri Mamluk
170	Mausoleum of Qurqumas	Burji Mamluk
173	Zawiya of Gulaq	Burji Mamluk
175	Madrasa and sabil of al-Ashraf Barsbay	Burji Mamluk
176	Mosque of Qadi Sharaf al-Din	Bahri Mamluk
177	Façade of the mosque of Muqbil al-Dawudi	Bahri Mamluk
178	Mosque of al-Gamali Yusuf	Burji Mamluk
179	Sabil-kuttab of al-Kirdani	Ottoman
180	Mosque and sabil of Muhammad Sai‘d Gaqmaq	Burji Mamluk
181	Mosque of Murad Pasha	Ottoman
182	Mosque of Qadi Yahya Zayn al-Din	Bahri Mamluk
184	Mosque of ‘Abd al-Ghani al-Fakhri	Burji Mamluk
185	Mosque of Asanbugha	Bahri Mamluk
186	Madrasa of Muhammad Abu’l Fadl	Bahri Mamluk
187	Complex of Sultan Barquq	Burji Mamluk
188	Wikala of Taghribardi	Burji Mamluk
189	Mosque of al-Ghuri and house to the north	Burji Mamluk
190	Mosque of al-Mu’ayyad Shaykh	Burji Mamluk
191	Mausoleum of Baybars al-Khayyat	Burji Mamluk
192	Zawiya of Fayruz	Burji Mamluk
193	Mosque of Aqsunqur al-Fariqani al-Habashli	Ottoman
194	Sabil-kuttab of ‘Abd al-Baqi Khayr al-Din	Ottoman
195	Mosque of al-Mar’a (Fatima Shaqra)	Burji Mamluk
196	Mosque of Yusuf Agha al-Hin	Ottoman
197	Sabil-kuttab of ‘Ali Bey al-Dumiati	Ottoman
198	Sabil in the waqf of Hebaysh	Ottoman
199	Bab Zuwayla	Fatimid
200	Mosque of Malika Safiya	Ottoman
201	Mosque of al-Burdayni	Ottoman
202	Remains of the mosque of Qawsun	Bahri Mamluk
203	Zawiya and sabil of Farag ibn Barquq	Burji Mamluk
204	Mosque of Qadi Yahya	Burji Mamluk
205	Minaret and door of the mosque of Bashtak	Bahri Mamluk
206	Mosque of Qaraqoga al-Hasani	Burji Mamluk
207	Façade and minaret of the mosque of Mughalbay Taz	Burji Mamluk
208	Palace of Radwan Bey	Ottoman
209	Mosque of Taghribardi	Burji Mamluk
210	Mosque of Hasan Pasha Tahir	Muhammad Ali
211	Mosque of Azbak al-Yusufi	Burji Mamluk
213	Sabil of Yusuf al-Kurdi	
214	Façade of zawiya of ‘Abd al-Rahman Katkhuda	Ottoman
215	Qubba of Awlad al-Asyad	Bahri Mamluk
217	Façade of the mosque of Gaqmaq	Burji Mamluk
218	Mosque of Sarghatmish	Bahri Mamluk
219	Sabil of Yusuf Bey	Ottoman
220	Mosque of Ahmad ibn Tulun	Tulunid
221	Mosque of Salar and Sangar	Bahri Mamluk
222	Hawd of Qaytbay	Burji Mamluk
223	Mosque of Qaytbay	Burji Mamluk
224	Gate of the mosque of Qawsun	Bahri Mamluk
225	Takiyat al-Sulaymaniya	Ottoman
226	Sabil-kuttab of ‘Umar Bey	Ottoman
228	House of Qaytbay	Burji Mamluk
229	Tomb of Yusuf Agha al-Habashi	Ottoman
230	Sabil-kuttab of Yusuf Agha Dar al-Sa‘ada	Ottoman
232	Sabil of Mustafa Musali Shurbagi	Ottoman
233	Mosque of the amir Husayn	Bahri Mamluk
234	Mausoleum of Abu’l Yusufayn	Bahri Mamluk
235	House of Ahmad Katkhuda al-Razzaz	Ottoman
236	Sabil-kuttab of Taha Hasan al-Wardani	Ottoman
237	Minaret of the zawiyat al-Hunud	Bahri Mamluk
238	Sabil of Ibrahim Agha Mustahfizan	Ottoman
240	Sabil and tomb of ‘Umar Agha	Ottoman
241	Zawiya of Muhammad Durgham	
242	Madrasa of Qutlubugha al-Dhahabi	Bahri Mamluk
243	Sabil-kuttab of Hasan Agha Koklian	Ottoman
244	Hammam of Bashtak	Bahri Mamluk
245	Ribat of Ahmad ibn Sulayman	Bahri Mamluk
246	Sabil of Mustafa Sinan	Ottoman
247	Gate of Mangak al-Yusufi	Bahri Mamluk
248	Mosque of Khayrbak	Burji Mamluk
249	Palace of Alnaq al-Nasiri	Bahri Mamluk
250	Mosque of Aytmish al-Bagasi	Burji Mamluk
251	Hawd-kuttab of Aytmish al-Bagasi	Burji Mamluk
255	Door, tomb, and sabil-kuttab of Tarabay al-Sharifi	Burji Mamluk
256	Qubbat al-Komi	Burji Mamluk
257	Bimaristan of al-Mu’ayyad Shaykh	Burji Mamluk
258	Zawiya of Hasan al-Rumi	Ottoman
260	Sabil and hawd of ‘Abd al-Rahman Katkhuda	Ottoman
261	Qubbat al-Muzaffar ‘Alam al-Din Sangar	Bahri Mamluk
262	Sabil in the waqf of Yusuf Bey	Ottoman
263	Tomb of Hasan Sadaqa	Bahri Mamluk
265	Sabil-kuttab and rab‘ of al-Qizlar	Ottoman
266	Palace of Yashbak	Bahri Mamluk
267	Palace of the Amir Taz	Bahri Mamluk
268	Sabil-kuttab of ‘Ali Agha Dar al-Sa‘ada	Ottoman
269	Madrasa of Bashir Agha al-Gumdar	Bahri Mamluk
270	Tomb of Safi al-Din Gawhar	Bahri Mamluk
272	Sabil, zawiya, and wikala of Mustafa Bey Tabtabay	Ottoman
277	Tomb of ‘Ali al-Gizi	Bahri Mamluk
278	Bab Qaytbay (al-Qarafa)	Bahri Mamluk
287	Remains of the rab‘ of Tughugh	Bahri Mamluk
288	North minaret of al-Sultaniya	Bahri Mamluk
289	Mausoleum of al-Sultaniya	Bahri Mamluk
290	Khanqah and minaret of Qawsun	Bahri Mamluk
291	Mausoleum of Qawsun	Bahri Mamluk
303	Mausoleum of Yakub Shah al-Mihmandar	Burji Mamluk
305	Well of Salah al-Din (Bir Yusuf)	Ayyubid
307	Ayyubid wall	Ayyubid
308	Takiya and sabil-kuttab of Sultan Mahmud	Ottoman
309	Sabil-kuttab of Bashir Agha Dar Sa‘ada	Ottoman
311	Sabil in the waqf of Kulsun	Ottoman
312	Khanqah of Sa‘ad al-Din ibn Ghurab	Burji Mamluk
317	Minaret of the mosque of Gaqmaq	Burji Mamluk
321	House and sabil of al-Kritliya	Ottoman
322	Remains of the palace of al-Ghuri	Burji Mamluk
323	Hawd of Shaykhu	Bahri Mamluk
324	Sabil-kuttab of Qaytbay	Burji Mamluk
325	Gate of the Darb al-Labbana	Bahri Mamluk
326	Takiya of Taqi al-Din al-Bistami	Burji Mamluk
327	Tomb of Sandal al-Mangaki	Bahri Mamluk
328	Sabil-kuttab of Shahin Agha Ahmad	Ottoman
329	Sabil-kuttab of Muhammad Mustafa al-Muhasibgi	Ottoman
330	Gate of Malika Safiya	Ottoman
331	Sabil-kuttab of Ibrahim Katkhuda Mustahfizan	Ottoman
332	Takiyat al-Gulshani	Ottoman
334	Maq‘ad of the house of al-Manawi	Ottoman
335	Sabil-kuttab of ‘Abbas Agha	Ottoman
336	Remains of the palace of Muhammad ibn Souwaydan	Ottoman
337	Sabil-kuttab of Ruqayya Dudu	Ottoman
339	Bayt al-Sihaymi	Ottoman
351	Khan al-Zarakisha	Bahri Mamluk
352	Fatimid wall	Fatimid
353	Zawiyat al-Arbain	Muhammad Ali
355	House of ‘Abd al-Wahid al-Fasi	Ottoman
356	Bab al-Harat al-Mabyada	Ottoman
357	Tomb of al-Shurafa	Burji Mamluk
358	Sabil-kuttab of Nafisa al-Bayda	Ottoman
359	Tomb of ‘Ali Negm	Ottoman
360	Mausoleum of Qansuh Abu Sa‘id	Burji Mamluk
361	Sabil and house of Hasan (Sabil Darb al-Masmat)	Ottoman
363	Sabil of Ibrahim Shurbagi Mustahfizan	Ottoman
365	Zawiya of Radwan Bey	Ottoman
366	Sabat in the waqf of al-Fakahani	Ottoman
367	Façade of the wikalat al-Kharbutli	Ottoman
368	Façade of the houses of Munib al-Alayli and Shaykh al-Qayati	Ottoman
369	Waterwheel	Bahri Mamluk
370	Mausoleum of Aqtay al-Farisi	Bahri Mamluk
371	Zawiya of Udah Basha	Ottoman
374	Zawiya and sabil-kuttab of Shaykh Murshid	Ottoman
375	House of Hasan ‘Abd al-Latif	Ottoman
376	Sabil of the amir Khalil	Ottoman
377	Mosque of Qara Muhammad Pasha	Ottoman
378	Mosque of Sayyida ‘Ayesha	Ottoman
382	Mosque of Sulayman Agha al-Silahdar	Muhammad Ali
395	Façade of the wikala of Nafisa al-Bayda	Ottoman
396	Wikala and sabil of ‘Abbas Agha	Ottoman
397	Wikala and sabil of al-Naqadi	Ottoman
398	Wikalat Bazar’a	Ottoman
399	Wikalat al-Firakh	Bahri Mamluk
400	Manzil in the waqf al-Haramayn	Ottoman
401	Sabil-kuttab of Tusun Pasha	Muhammad Ali
402	Sabil-kuttab of Isma‘il Pasha	Muhammad Ali
403	Façade of the wikalat al-Lawand	Ottoman
404	Hawd of ‘Abd al-Rahman Katkhuda	Ottoman
405	Sabil-kuttab of Hasan Katkhuda	Ottoman
406	Qasaba of Radwan Bey (western side, including the façade onto Midan Bab Zuwayla)	Ottoman
407	House façades at nos. 17, 19, and 20, Shari‘ al-Khiyamiya	Ottoman
408	Qasaba of Radwan Bey (eastern side, including the façade onto Midan Bab Zuwayla)	Ottoman
409	Façades to the south of the zawiya of Farag ibn Barquq	Burji Mamluk
410	Hammam of al-Mu’ayyad Shaykh	Burji Mamluk
411	Wikala and sabil-kuttab of Gamal al-Din al-Dhahabi	Ottoman
413	Qubba of Shaykh ‘Abdallah	Ottoman
414	Mosque of al-Khalawati	Ottoman
417	Tomb of Sangar al-Gamaqdar	Bahri Mamluk
420	Sabil of Hasan Agha Arzingan	Muhammad Ali
421	Sabil, hawd, and manzil of Kur ‘Abdallah	Ottoman
422	Wikalat al-Nasharin	Ottoman
423	Wikalat al-Sanadqiya	Ottoman
424	Façade of the wikala in the waqf of al-Matyali	Ottoman
425	Wikalat al-Gallaba	Ottoman
426	Minaret and mosque of ‘Ali al-Amri	Ottoman
428	Madrasat al-Kamiliya	Ayyubid
429	Sabil of Salim Agha	Ottoman
431	Façade of zawiyat al-Tabbakh	Ottoman
433	Wikala and sabil in the waqf al-Haramayn	Ottoman
434	Wikala of Abu’l Rus	Ottoman
435	Manzil in the waqf of Ibrahim Effendi Shenan	Ottoman
436	Sabil, mosque, and tomb of Shaykh Ramadan	Ottoman
437	House of Shaykh Sayim	Ottoman
439	House and qa‘a in the waqf of al-‘Abbar	Ottoman
440	Maq‘ad of Qaytbay	Burji Mamluk
443	Parts of the house of Gawhar Agha	Ottoman
445	House of Sitt Wasila‘	Ottoman
446	House of ‘Abd al-Rahman al-Harrawi	Ottoman
447	Sabil-kuttab of ‘Uthman ‘Abdallah Roq‘et al-Qamh	Ottoman
448	Mosque and sabil of Shaykh Muhammad al-Ghurayib	Ottoman
451	Façade of the mosque of al-Hifni	Ottoman
452	House and sabil-kuttab of the amir ‘Abdallah	Ottoman
453	Wikala of Shaykh ‘Abud al-Mana‘ifa	Ottoman
457	House in the waqf of Ibrahim Agha	Ottoman
458	Khan Sa‘id	Burji Mamluk
459	Mosque of ‘Ali ibn al-Arabi and house of Muhammad al-Mahruqi	Ottoman
460	Wikalat al-Sharaybi twelfth century	Ottoman
461	Sabil-kuttab of Ahmad Effendi Salim	Ottoman
462	Mosque of al-Gawhari and façade of the adjoining building	Muhammad Ali
463	Manzil of al-Sadat al-Wafa‘iya	Ottoman
464	Mosque of Ganem al-Tagir	Burji Mamluk
465	Mosque of al-Ghamri	Burji Mamluk
466	Qa‘a of al-Dardir	Ayyubid
468	Façade of the wikalat al-Tabtabay	Ottoman
469	Façade of the houses next to the sabil al-Tabtabay	Ottoman
470	Manzil of ‘Uthman ‘Amara and Zaynab Umm Ahmad	Ottoman
471	House of Mustafa Ga‘far	Ottoman
476	Mausoleum of Ragab al-Shirazi	Bahri Mamluk
477	Zawiya of Abu’l Khayr al-Kulaybati	Fatimid
478	Two tombs in the zawiyat al-Sutuhi	Bahri Mamluk
479	Fatimid mausoleum	Fatimid
480	Mosque of Sa‘id al-Su‘ada	
481	Façade of the mosque of al-Bulqini	Bahri Mamluk
482	Church of the Virgin, Harat Zuwayla	
483	Church of the Virgin, Harat al-Rum	
484	Façade and door of wikala of al-Uqbi, or Khan al-Fisqiya	Burji Mamluk
485	Mosque of Yahya ibn ‘Aqab	Ottoman
486	House in the waqf of al-Safti	Ottoman
487	Façades of houses in Shari‘ al-Dardir	Ottoman
488	House in the waqf of al-Magharba	
489	Sabil and houses in Shari‘ al-Ghamri	Ottoman
490	Façade of the manzil and hammam al-Margush	Ottoman
491	Façade and portal of the wikala and sabil-kuttab in the ‘Atfat al-Zababqi	Ottoman
493	House of ‘Abd al-Mu’min Shakrun	Ottoman
495	Manzil in the waqf of Bashir Agha	Ottoman
496	Sabil and wikalat al-Manawi	Ottoman
497	House of ‘Ali Effendi Labib	Ottoman
498	Sabil-rab‘ al-Balfiya	Ottoman
499	Hawsh of ‘Utay / Wikala of Muhsin Ramadan	Ottoman
500	Façade of the house of al-Kashif	Ottoman
501	House of Mahmud Sudan	Ottoman
502	Zawiya of Sidi Muhammad al-Sha’rani	Ottoman
503	Mosque of Muhammad ‘Ali	Muhammad Ali
504	House in the waqf of Banush Bey	Ottoman
505	The Gawhara Palace	Muhammad Ali
506	Sabil-kuttab of ‘Ayesha al-Sutuhiya	Ottoman
507	Sabil of Kosa Sinan	Ottoman
510	Qubba of Shaykh Su‘ud	Ottoman
514	House of Khusraw Pasha	Ottoman
518	Rab‘ of Qaytbay	Burji Mamluk
521	Mosque of Ahmad Bey Kohya	Bahri Mamluk
534	Maq‘ad of the Faramangui House	Ottoman
541	House in the waqf of al-Mulla	Ottoman
545	House in the waqf of Mustafa Sinan eleventh century	Ottoman
548	Wikala in the waqf al-Tutungi eleventh century	Ottoman
549	Remains of the palace of al-Nasir Muhammad	Bahri Mamluk
550	Two street roofings behind the mosque of al-Ghuri	Burji Mamluk
551	Bab al-Khala (al-Qarafa)	Ayyubid
552	Tiles in the mosque of al-Khudayri	Ottoman
553	Sabil-kuttab of Mustafa Shurbagi Mustahfizan	Ottoman
554	Zawiya of Gaf‘ar al-Sadiq	Ottoman
555	Bab al-‘Azab	Ottoman
556	Bab al-Mudarrag	Ayyubid
557	Sabil of al-Wafa‘iya	Burji Mamluk
558	Mosque of ‘Ayesha al-Sutuhiya	Ottoman
559	House of Amna bint Salim	Ottoman
561	Sabil of al-Nasir Muhammad	Bahri Mamluk
562	Hammam of Inal	Burji Mamluk
564	Hammam al-Tanbali	Ottoman
565	Mausoleum of Ahmad Pasha Tahir	Muhammad Ali
566	Hammam al-Effendi	Ottoman
567	Hammam al-‘Adawi	Muhammad Ali
569	Cistern in the Citadel	Bahri Mamluk
586	Tomb of Ibrahim Khalifa Guindian	Ottoman
588	Sabil-kuttab of Husayn al-Shu’aybi	Ottoman
590	Mausoleum of Husam al-Din al-Turuntay	Bahri Mamluk
591	Sabil and wikala of Udah Basha	Ottoman
592	Hammam al-Malatyali	Ottoman
593	Hawd of Ibrahim Agha Mustahfizan	Ottoman
595	House in the waqf of Ibrahim Agha	Ottoman
596	Hammam al-Sukkariya	Ottoman
597	Wikalat al-Muhammadayn	Ottoman
598	Wikala in the waqf al-Haramayn	Ottoman
604	Wikala of Sulayman Agha al-Silahdar	Muhammad Ali
605	The Archives Building	Muhammad Ali
606	The Mint	Muhammad Ali
609	House in the waqf of Mahmud al-Shabsiri	Ottoman
612	The Harim Palace	Muhammad Ali
613	House in the waqf of Ibrahim Agha	Ottoman
614	Bab al-Barqiya	Ayyubid
615	Façade of the wikala of Bedawiya Shahin	Ottoman
616	Gate of the Bayt al-Qadi	Muhammad Ali
617	Wall of the Qaramidan	Bahri Mamluk
619	House in the waqf of Ibrahim Agha	Ottoman

== List of unlisted monuments ==
Monument number	Monument	Period
U1	Wikalat al-Shishini	Ottoman
U2	Tomb of Khalil Ibrahim Shurbagi	Ottoman
U3	House of al-Khorazati	Muhammad Ali
U4	Hammam al-Gamaliya	Ottoman
U5	Wikalat al-Mulla al-Kabira	Ottoman
U6	Mosque of al-Shuhada	Muhammad Ali
U7	House of al-Agam AH	Muhammad Ali
U8	Bab al-Qantara AH	Fatimid
U9	Mosque of Shams al-Din al-Ramli	Ottoman
U10	Bab al-Tawfiq	Fatimid
U11	Tower no. 17	Fatimid
U12	Mosque of Isma‘il al-Sha’rani	Ottoman
U13	Sabil-kuttab of Ahmad Pasha	Muhammad Ali
U14	Wikalat al-Gulshaniya	Ottoman
U15	Wikalat ‘Ain al-Gazal	Ottoman
U16	Hammam al-Nahhasin	Ottoman
U17	Wikalat al-‘Asal	Ottoman
U18	Haïm Capoussi Synagogue	
U19	Wikala of ‘Umar ibn Trak	
U20	House entrance, no. 22, Shari‘ Khan Abu Takiya	Ottoman
U21	Synagogue of Maimonides	
U22	Karaite Synagogue	Muhammad Ali
U23	Church of the Holy Order of St. Francis	Muhammad Ali
U24	Portal of the wikalat al-Mihmandariya	
U25	Structure adjacent to Ayyubid wall	
U26	Minaret and portal to the madrasat al-Ghanamiya	
U27	Takiya of Abu’l Dhahab	Muhammad Ali
U28	Wikala of Bakr Shurbagi	Ottoman
U29	Mosque of Ahmad al-Dardir	Ottoman
U30	Hammam al-Sharaybi	Ottoman
U31	Zawiyat al-Harisi	
U32	Ottoman maq‘ad	Ottoman
U33	Wikalat al-Sayf	Muhammad Ali
U34	Cathedral of St. Nicholas	Muhammad Ali
U35	Hammam al-Gabali	
U36	Umm Husayn Bey	Muhammad Ali
U37	Tomb of Fatma al-Nabawiya	Muhammad Ali
U38	Hammam Darb al-Ahmar	
U39	Wikala of Yusuf Agha Dar al-Sa‘ada	Ottoman
U40	Zawiya of Arif Pasha	Muhammad Ali
U41	Zawiya of ‘Ali al-Maghrabi	
U42	Hammam al-Qirabiya	
U43	House of Hanafi al-Bayda, no. 4, ‘Atfat Isma‘il Kashif	Ottoman
U44	Sabil-kuttab, no. 5, Shari‘ al-Magharbellin	
U45	Maq‘ad to the east of the Bab Zuwayla t	
U46	Islamic Museum	Muhammad Ali
U47	Mosque of Ragab Agha	Muhammad Ali
U48	House, no. 5, Shari‘ al-Qirabiya	Muhammad Ali
U49	Maq‘ad, no. 14, Shari‘ al-Ganibakiya	
U50	Rab‘-wikala, no. 8, Darb al-Dalil	
U51	The Citadel, wall of the Northern Enclosure	
U52	Tomb of Shaykh Ibrahim al-Giza	
U53	Uthman al-Fathi	
U54	The Citadel Army Barracks	Muhammad Ali
U55	Tomb of al-Marghani	Muhammad Ali
U56	House, no. 45, Shari‘ al-Mahgar	Muhammad Ali
U57	House, no. 2, ‘Atfat al-Zelahi	Muhammad Ali
U58	Zawiya and tomb of Shaykh ‘Abdallah al-Baz	
U59	House of ‘Umar Agha	Ottoman
U60	House, no. 6, Shari‘ Hammam Bashtak	Ottoman
U61	Rab‘ al-Tabbana	Burji Mamluk
U62	New mosque of Qawsun	Muhammad Ali
U63	House, no. 52, Shari‘ Muhammad ‘Ali	Muhammad Ali
U64	House, no. 15, Harat Ahmad Pasha Yaken	Muhammad Ali
U65	House, no. 18, Harat Ahmad Pasha Yaken	Muhammad Ali
U66	House, no. 12, Harat Ahmad Pasha Yaken	Muhammad Ali
U67	House, no. 6, Harat Ahmad Pasha Yaken	Muhammad Ali
U68	Sabil of ‘Ulfat Qadin	Muhammad Ali
U69	Mosque of Mustafa Fadil Pasha	Muhammad Ali
U70	Mosque of ‘Ali al-Tarrabi	
U71	Well, quarry, and ancillary structures	
U72	Bayt al-Gazia	
U73	House, no. 24, Harat Salim Pasha	
U75	Wikala, no. 23, Suq al-Silah	Ottoman
U76	Wikala, no. 4, Suq al-Silah	
U77	Wikala of Qaytbay al-Surugiya	Burji Mamluk
U78	Hammam al-Dud	
U79	Wikalat al-Khalawati	
U80	Tomb of Muhammad al-Ka‘aki	Ottoman
U81	Wall of the southern enclosure and Bab al-Gabal	
U82	Archaeological Garden and Theater	
U83	Diwan of Schools	Muhammad Ali
U84	Mamluk kitchens	
U85	Bab al-Gedid	Muhammad Ali
U86	Bab al-Alam, Military Prison, and School of Artillery	Muhammad Ali
U87	Burg al-Siba‘	Bahri Mamluk
U88	Qa‘at al-Ashrafiya	Bahri Mamluk
U89	Burg al-Rafraf	Bahri Mamluk
U90	House of Hasan Pasha Rashid	Muhammad Ali
U91	The Double-Cross Hall	
U92	The Arsenal	Muhammad Ali
U93	Inner Gate	Muhammad Ali
U94	Qubbat al-Biraqdar	Ottoman
U95	Industrial area in the lower enclosure	Muhammad Ali
U96	Corbeled façade	Ottoman
U97	Well of the Hawsh	Bahri Mamluk
U98	Madrasa of Sidi Shahin	Muhammad Ali
U99	Tomb of Muhammad Agha	Muhammad Ali
U100	Palace of Muhammad ‘Ali	Muhammad Ali
U101	Burg al-Zawiya	
U102	Ottoman sabil-kuttab	Ottoman
U103	Mosque of Sidi Ahmad al-Rifa‘i	Muhammad Ali
U104	Tomb of Mustafa Kamil	
U105	Takiyat Mevleviya	Muhammad Ali
U106	Hammam of Shaykhu	Bahri Mamluk
U107	Umm ‘Abbas	Muhammad Ali
U108	Sabil of Ibrahim Bey al-Wali	Ottoman
U109	Kitchens of Muhammad ‘Ali	Muhammad Ali
U110	Tomb and zawiya of Sidi Galal al-Assiuti	Ottoman
U111	Minaret of the mosque of Muhammad al-Burdayni	Ottoman
U112	Wikala of Hasan Katkhuda	Ottoman
U113	Hammam of Kushqadam	Bahri Mamluk
U114	Mosque of Kalamtay al-Gamali	Muhammad Ali
U115	Tomb of Ibrahim al-Fawwar	Muhammad Ali
U116	Mosque of Sayyida Sukayna	Muhammad Ali
U117	Hammam al-Khalifa	Muhammad Ali
U118	Mosque of Shagarat al-Durr	Muhammad Ali
U119	Sabil of Qaytbay	Burji Mamluk
U120	Wikala, No. 53 Shari‘ Tulun	Ottoman
U121	Hammam, No. 83 Shari‘ Tulun	
U122	Tomb of Sidi al-Arbain	
U123	Mosque of Muhammad al-Buktumri	Muhammad Ali
U124	Wikala of Hasan Katkhuda al-Bagdali	
U125	House of Sakna Basha	Muhammad Ali
U126	Sayyida Zaynab Children’s Park	
U127	Citadel retaining wall	
U128	Mosque of Muhammad Kishr	
U129	Wikala, no. 11, Shari‘ Mu‘izz li-Din Allah	
U130	Zawiya of ‘Abd al-Karim	Ottoman
U131	Mosque of Anbar al-Nur	Muhammad Ali
U132	Church of St. Mark	Muhammad Ali
U133	Muhammad ‘Ali-period palace	Muhammad Ali
U134	Mansur Palace	Muhammad Ali
U135	Mosque of ‘Abbas II Hilmi	Muhammad Ali
U136	Palace, no. 4, Shari‘ Ibrahim Bey	Muhammad Ali
