= Jamal al-Din al-Ustadar =

Emir of the Mamluk sultan

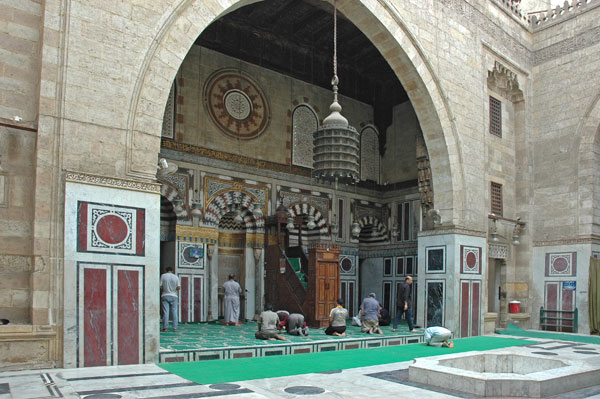
- Amir Jamal al-Din al-Ustadar Mosque

Emir of Nasir al-Din Faraj

Personal details
- Died: 1411
- Known for: Madrasa of Jamal al-Din

Jamal al-Din al-Ustadar was an Emir of Nasir al-Din Faraj, the Mamluk sultan of Egypt. He was very influential in his time, including his work on some important building structures in Cairo. He is also a controversial figure, who was removed from his post and executed in 1411.

== The Madrasa of Jamal al-Din ==
One of Jamal al-Din's biggest contributions to the Cairo landscape was his role in designing the Madrasa of Jamal al-Din in 1407, an elaborate cruciform madrasa dedicated to all four schools of law. It is located in the al-jamaliyah district of Cairo Egypt, a district whose name comes from him and the architectural influence he had. The design and decoration of this madrasa was quite ornate, as Jamal al-Din took some of the materials from the deteriorating madrasa of al-Ashraf. This was a practice often utilized by Mamluk's throughout history, perhaps as a cost saving mechanism. The madrasa is in the four-iwan layout, meaning it contains four different hallways, and each hallway faced an open courtyard in the center. It contains all of the features generally found in a religious building, including a bent entryway, a tomb, and an ablution area. However, the building of this madrasa was not without controversy, as it is alleged that Jamal al-Din over-invested materials and capital in order to enhance it and model it after a palace with the intention of retiring in it. He eventually faced public disgrace, and al-Din Faraj executed Jamal al-Din and annulled his transactions that went into making the madrasa in 1411. However, he refrained from tearing it down, and it still stands to this day. The madrasa received earthquake damage in 1992 to go along with centuries of weather and general wear, but it was restored with the help of the Ministry of Culture.

He also founded the Maḥmūdīyah Library in Cairo in 1394-1395 CE, making it the largest madrasa library in Mamluk Egypt and Syria.

== Bibliography ==
- Mayer, L.A. (1933). Saracenic Heraldry: A Survey. Oxford: Oxford University Press. (Mayer, 1933, pp. 31, 257 f; his madrasa, 258)
