= Mosque of Almalik al-Jukandar =

Mosque in Cairo, Egypt

Coordinates: 30°2′50.75″N 31°15′50.36″E

The Mosque of Almalik al-Jukandar is located near the Mashad of Husayn and Al-Azhar Mosque in the historic area of Cairo. Founded during the Bahri Mamluk period during the third reign of Al-Nasir Muhammad, it is less documented by modern researchers and historians.

== Founder ==
Almalik al-Jukandar was a powerful and wealth Mamluk amir during the third reign of Al-Nasir Muhammad, and later Qalawunid sultans. He would die while imprisoned in Alexandria in 747 A.H. (1346 C.E.) during the reign of al-Kamil Sha'ban.

== The Institution ==
According to al-Maqrizi, Almalik al-Jukandar founded it in 758 A.H. (1357 C.E.) as a madrasa that taught the Shafiʽi school of law. It was provided for by several endowments (awqaf). The complex also included a library.

== Inscription ==
On the main entrance of the building there is an inscription, although in poor condition, that flanks both sides of the portal. It reads:

Basmala, has constructed this mosque (the humble servant ever in need of) God Most High Almalik al-Jukandar, (officer of) al-Nasir (Muhammad), seeking the pardon of God Most High and His forgiveness. Dated the year 719 of the hijra of the Prophet (1319–20), salvation be upon him.

As the inscription makes clear, the founder of the institution is Almalik al-Jukandar during the third reign of al-Nasir (Muhammad).

== See also ==
- List of Historic Monuments in Cairo
