= Saad al-Din bin Ghurab =

De facto ruler of the Egyptian Mamluk Sultanate (r. 1399–1406)

Emir Saad al-Din bin Ghurab
- سعد الدين بن غراب (Egyptian Arabic) Ⲥⲁⲇ Ⲉⲗⲇⲓⲛ ⲥⲉⲛⲄⲟⲣⲏⲃ (Coptic)
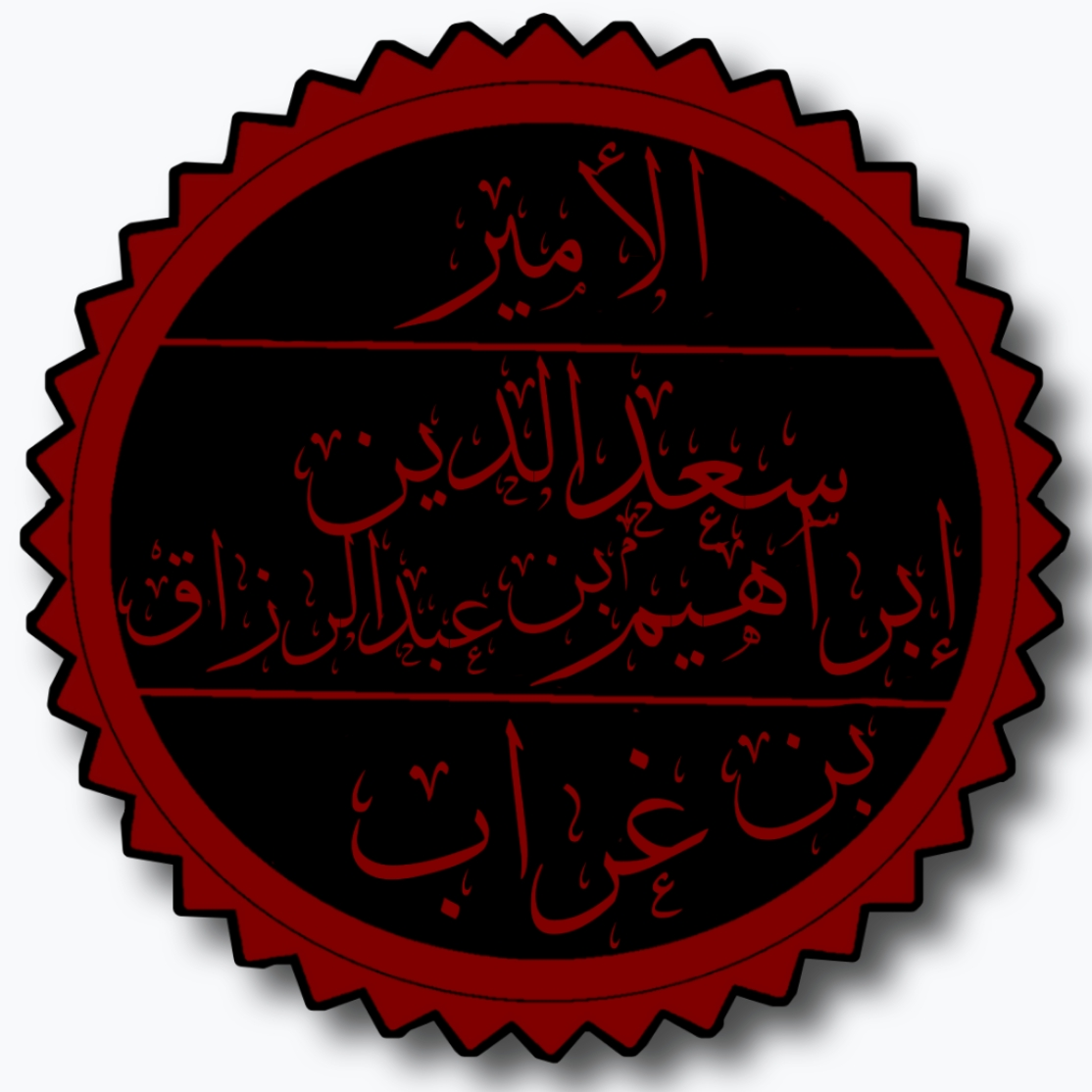
- Rank of Saad al-Din bin Ghurab

Ustadar (Majordomo)
- In office 1400/1–1406
- Monarch: An-Nasir Faraj
- Preceded by: Jamal al-Din Mahmoud
- Succeeded by: unknown

Regent to the throne of the Sultanate
- In office 20 September 1405 – November 1405
- Monarch: Izz al-Din Abd al-Aziz

De facto ruler of the Egyptian Mamluk Sultanate
- In office 1399–1406
- Monarchs: An-Nasir Faraj; Izz al-Din Abd al-Aziz

Personal details
- Born: 1378 Alexandria, Egyptian Mamluk Sultanate
- Died: 10 March 1406 (aged 27–28) Cairo, Egyptian Mamluk Sultanate
- Resting place: Bab al-Mahrouq, Cairo
- Relations: Ghurab (grandfather); Abd al-Razzaq bin Ghurab (father); Majid bin Ghurab (older brother)
- Occupation: Qadi (Judge), Nazir al-Khas, Nazir al-Guyush, Kaitb al-Sir, Ustadar
- Languages: Coptic, Arabic, Mamluk-Kipchak
- Nickname: السلطان الغير متوج (The uncrowned Sultan)

Military service
- Allegiance: Egyptian Mamluk Sultanate
- Branch/service: Egyptian army
- Rank: Nazir al-Guyush; Amir Mi'a Muqadam Alaf
- Battles/wars: Capture of Baghdad (1394)

Al-Qadi al-Amir Saad al-Din Ibrahim bin Abd al-Razzaq bin Ghurab al-Qibti al-Iskandarani al-Masry, Saad al-Din bin Alam al-Din bin Shams al-Din (Egyptian Arabic: القاضي الأمير سعد الدين إبراهيم بن عبد الرزاق بن غراب القبطي الاسكندراني المصري، سعد الدين بن علم الدين بن شمس الدين, Coptic: Ⲡⲓⲣⲉϥϯϩⲁⲡ ⲡⲓϫⲱϫ Ⲥⲁⲇ Ⲉⲗⲇⲓⲛ Ⲉⲃⲣⲏϩⲓⲙ ⲥⲉⲛⲀⲃⲧ Ⲉⲗⲣⲍⲏⲕ ⲥⲉⲛⲄⲟⲣⲏⲃ ⲡⲣⲉⲙⲛⲕⲩⲡⲧⲓ ⲡⲣⲉⲙⲛⲣⲁⲕⲱϯ ⲡⲣⲉⲙⲛⲭⲏⲙⲓ, Ⲥⲁⲇ Ⲉⲗⲇⲓⲛ ⲥⲉⲛⲀⲗⲙ Ⲉⲗⲇⲓⲛ ⲥⲉⲛϢⲉⲙⲥ Ⲉⲗⲇⲓⲛ) (1378 AD – 10 March 1406 AD | 780 AH – 19 Ramadan 808 AH), commonly known as Saad al-Din bin Ghurab, was Amir al-Umara (the Prince of Princes) in the Mamluk Sultanate of Egypt and its de facto ruler starting from 1399, following the death of Sultan al-Zahir Barquq. Ibn Ghurab was able to combine the roles of Arbab al-Aqlam (Masters of the Pen) and Arbab al-Syouf (Masters of the Sword). He played a significant role in mitigating the effects of the famine that struck Egypt during the era of Sultan an-Nasir Faraj by distributing bread, clothing and food, and spending money on charitable activities.

== Life ==
=== Lineage ===
Ibrahim bin Abd al-Razzaq bin Ghurab, also known as Saad al-Din bin Alam al-Din bin Shams al-Din, had a grandfather named Ghurab who was of Egyptian origin and one of the Christians of Alexandria who converted to Islam and began writing. Ghurab rose through the ranks of diwaniyah positions (royal court/office) until he became the governor of Alexandria before the year 767 AH / 1365 AD. He was later unjustly accused of colluding with the Cypriots during their invasion of the city in that year. Consequently, its governor, Ibn Aram, arrested and executed him, leaving behind his son Abd al-Razzaq, who succeeded him in a similar role. Abd al-Razzaq died in 784 AH / 1382 AD, leaving two young sons: Majid, the eldest, and Ibrahim, who was four years old at the time.

Ibrahim received an extensive cultural education and was a student of the renowned scholar Ibn Khaldun, who also raised him. Ibrahim was the scholar's closest associate in Egypt, and due to their close relationship, Ibn Khaldun was highly respected and held a prominent status in the state.

=== Upbringing and advancement in positions ===
The upbringing and prominence of Ibrahim bin Abd al-Razzaq bin Ghurab in Egypt were closely linked to his teacher, Jamal al-Din Mahmoud, who was one of the most senior officials in the royal court at the time. Mahmoud advanced through the ranks to attain the position of ustadar, handling it with skill and shrewdness. He was also entrusted with the management of the state’s finances, overseeing the royal funds of Sultan al-Zahir Barquq. His wealth grew significantly, to the extent that the common people began to fear him, saying: "God has given iron to Dawud and gold to Mahmoud."

When Jamal al-Din Mahmoud began working in Alexandria, he noticed Ibrahim bin Abd al-Razzaq, who was a young child under the age of ten, writing under the supervision of his older brother Majid. Mahmoud observed Ibrahim's signs of virtue, noting his handsomeness and cheerful demeanor. Impressed by the child's potential, he approached him and gave him the name Saad al-Din. Mahmoud took Ibrahim to Cairo in the year 790 AH / 1388 AD, while Ibrahim was still only ten years old. Mahmoud trained him in writing and arithmetic, and Ibrahim excelled in these subjects. Consequently, Mahmoud appointed him as the clerk of his funds. Ibrahim performed his tasks diligently and became more knowledgeable about financial matters than Jamal al-Din al-Ustadar himself.

Later, Ibrahim bin Abd al-Razzaq bin Ghurab overthrew Jamal al-Din Mahmoud by supporting the governor of Cairo, Alaa al-Din bin al-Tablawi. He subsequently overthrew Ibn Tablawi and continued to displace senior statesmen until he became the most prominent figure under Sultan al-Zahir Barquq. Ibrahim was appointed Supervisor of Special (Nazir al-Khas) in 798 AH and as ustadar in 803 AH. He participated in several military campaigns, including the liberation of Baghdad from Timur in 1394. Upon the death of al-Zahir Barquq, Ibrahim became one of an-Nasir Faraj's guardians and successfully persuaded an-Nasir Faraj to withdraw from public life in Cairo and to appoint his brother Izz al-Din Abd al-Aziz as Sultan. At this point, Ibrahim bin Abd al-Razzaq bin Ghurab effectively became the de facto ruler of the state and the de facto Sultan.

=== Role in overcoming the famine ===
He played a commendable role in mitigating the effects of the famine that struck Egypt during the era of an-Nasir Faraj. He clothed the needy, distributed bread and food to the poor, and spent money on charitable causes. When the epidemic persisted for months and the senior emirs were unable to continue burying the dead, Ibn Ghurab insisted on taking on the task, even at the cost of his own wealth. He demonstrated exceptional dedication, setting a notable example in overcoming the crisis. It was said, “Ibn Ghurab has cut [his expenses] (فصل ابن غراب),” as he set up a washbasin in his house and had porters bring deceased individuals from the streets to his door, where he took care of their affairs. By the end of the period from Rajab to Shawwal in the year 806 AH / 1403 AD, he had overseen the burial of 12,700 people.

== Control over the state ==
"He does not like anyone to share the rule with him." -The description of the historian, Taqi al-Din al-Maqrizi, of Ibn Ghurab.

There is no doubt that Ibn Ghurab played a crucial role in hiding an-Nasir Faraj and later restoring him to the Sultanate. This act earned him favor and a high rank with the Sultan, who granted him the title of Amir Mia Muqadam Alaf (أمير مائة مقدم ألف). Ibn Ghurab was given significant authority and entrusted with managing the state’s affairs without needing further consultation. He donned the kalfatah (كلفتاه), a very luxurious and ornate kaftan, and took up a sword, abandoning his former role as a writer.

Ibn Ghurab asked a member of his entourage whether his appearance as an emir was better than his previous appearance as a judge in the diwan (royal court). The man replied, “No, by God, your appearance as an emir is better, more beautiful, and more fitting for you.” However, Ibn Ghurab did not respond. After this period, he became a favored servant of both the Sultan and the emirs. He allowed his enemies to retain their positions after an-Nasir Faraj's return, reminded his allies of his support in restoring their lost positions, influence, and jobs, and provided them with financial assistance during their time of need and displacement to the Levant.

Ibn Ghurab proudly declared that he had established the sultanate of Izz al-Din Abd al-Aziz and removed an-Nasir Faraj, only to later restore an-Nasir Faraj without any apparent necessity. As al-Maqrizi remarked, “How many times he mutilated a throne, gored a ram, leveled lofty mountains, and uprooted countries from their solid foundations.”

Ibn Ghurab was distinctive among his predecessors and successors in the Egyptian state for holding four of the most important court positions in the Sultanate: Supervisor of Special (Nazir al-Khas, ناظر الخاص), Supervisor of the Armies (Nazir al-Guyush, ناظر الجيوش), and Secret Writer (Katib al-Sir, كاتب السر). He was the second person in the history of the Egyptian Mamluk state to combine these first three positions, a feat not repeated until the era of historian Ibn Taghribirdi. Additionally, his skill and cunning allowed him to effectively combine the roles of Arbab al-Aqlam and Arbab al-Syouf, which had a significant impact on the state. These roles included the Ustadaria (الأستادارية), the Imra (الإمرة), and the Ishara (الإشارة), positions rarely held simultaneously.

Ibn Ghurab's political acumen and cunning enabled him to overcome numerous obstacles that nearly cost him his positions and his life. Despite these challenges, he swiftly regained his roles and continued to participate in the state’s political affairs. His achievements underscore his exceptional capabilities, a level of success typically reserved for those with many decades of experience, despite his untimely death at the age of twenty-eight.

== Death ==
When Saad al-Din returned to his house, he no longer wore his kalfatah and fell ill, remaining in bed. During his illness, people witnessed the high regard in which he was held, with senior emirs such as Emir Yashbak and others visiting him daily. They stood respectfully, promptly responding to his commands and avoiding what he forbade. His reverence was typically reserved for the most important kings and sultans.

Saad al-Din died on the night of Thursday, the 19th of Ramadan in the year 808 AH (10 March 1406 AD), having not yet reached the age of thirty. An-Nasir Faraj, along with most of the state's emirs, came to pray for him. Faraj carried his coffin on his shoulder and intended to continue to his final resting place, but was persuaded by the emirs to return to the citadel due to the long distance between the prayer area and his burial site outside Bab al-Mahrouq. The emirs took turns carrying his body until the end. An-Nasir Faraj also provided for Saad al-Din's children and ensured that his estate was not confiscated, honoring him for his role in restoring the Sultanate.

He was a handsome young man, known for his generosity and inclination toward doing good and charitable deeds, especially during the epidemic of 806 AH. His acts of kindness during this time earned him widespread recognition. It is said that throughout his tenure, from the moment he assumed his positions until his death, not a single Mamluk of the Sultan, whether old or young, approached him in need without receiving melted sugar to drink from him.

Historians have noted a few faults in Ibn Ghurab’s character, including his betrayal of his master, Jamal al-Din Mahmoud, his prosecution before Sultan Barquq, some instances of injustice regarding his finances, and his ambition for power, which occasionally led him to aggressively confront his opponents, such as Ibn al-Tablawi and Yalbugha al-Salmi. However, he did not shed blood throughout his life. This restraint is a notable advantage for someone involved in governance and politics. Al-Maqrizi commented on him at the conclusion of his writing:

"A boy who had something that pleased his friend. However, he had something worse for the enemies."

Senior historians such as al-Maqrizi, Ibn Hajar, and Al-Ayni noted that Emir Saad al-Din Ibrahim bin Ghurab was on the verge of becoming a sultan, not merely the de facto ruler, but he died before achieving this status.

== Monuments ==
- Khanqah of Saad al-Din bin Ghurab - Cairo
- Dome of Saad al-Din bin Ghurab - Cairo
