= Madrasa of Tatar al-Hijaziya =

Madrasa in Egypt

The madrasa of Tatar al-Hijaziya is located in the old Fatimid capital of al-Qahira, which became part of modern Cairo. Built during the second reign of al-Nasir Hasan, it also contained her mausoleum (qubba).

== Founder ==
Tatar al-Hijaziya (Arabic: تتر الحجازية, romanized: Tatar al-Ḥijāzīya) was a daughter of al-Nasir Muhammad. She was married to several prominent Mamluk amirs, although it was her husband Maliktamur al-Hijazi that she got her nisba "al-Hijaziya" from.

== Inscription ==
A foundation inscription on the structure has survived and reads:

Basmala, has ordered the construction of this blessed madrasa, through the grace of God and His abundant favour, seeking God's satisfaction, the virtuous princess Tatar Khatun al-Hijaziyya Karima al-Maqam al-Malik al-Nasir Nasir al-Dunya wa'l-Din Hasan son of the late martyred sultan al-Nasir Muhammad son of Qalawun al-Salihi, may God protect them with his grace. Its completion was at the end of Ramadan in year 761 AH/14 August 1360.

The foundation inscription makes clear that it was Tatar al-Hijaziya that founded the institution.

== Institution ==
According to Al-Maqrizi, Tatar al-Hijaziya established it as a madrasa that taught the Shafiʽi school of law and Maliki school of law. One of its prestigious professors was the famous Siraj al-Din Umar b. Raslan al-Bulqini. It also served as a congregational mosque on Fridays, where a sermon (Khutbah) would be given.

== See also ==
- List of Historic Monuments in Cairo
- Late medieval domes
