= Capture of Baghdad (1394) =

Egyptian-Jalayirid capture of Timurid-held Baghdad in 1394

- Part of Timurid conquests and invasions
Date	1394
Location	Baghdad, Timurid Empire (modern-day Iraq) 35.35°N 44.41667°E
Result	Jalayirid victory
Territorial changes	Baghdad returns to the Jalayirid Sultanate under Mamluk patronage

Belligerents
Timurid Empire	Mamluk Sultanate; Jalayirid Sultanate

Commanders and leaders
Khwaja Mas'ud Jalayir	Barquq; Saad al-Din bin Ghurab; Ahmad Jalayir

The Capture of Baghdad by the Egyptian Mamluk sultan Barquq and Jalayirid sultan Ahmad Jalayir. The city was taken without resistance in 1394.

== Background ==
In 1393, Timur renewed war with Ahmad. Near the end of August, he arrived in Baghdad, where Ahmad was residing. Deciding that defending the city was impossible, Ahmad fled and traveled to Egyptian-held Syria, and was granted asylum by Sultan Barquq.

Barquq received Ahmad with senior Egyptian statesmen. The first time the Jalayirid sultan saw Barquq, he wanted to kiss Sultan Barquq’s hand, but Barquq prevented him, hugged him, welcomed him, and gave him money, gold, concubines, and his own forces under his command. This generosity astonished Ahmad.

Days after this reception, Mongol messengers arrived, bringing a letter from Timur requesting the handover of the Jalayirid sultan. Barquq replied to them:

"How is it permissible, in the law of chivalry and loyalty, to handover our guest? And our lodger and the one who took refuge with us? Handing over Al-Qan Ahmad is impossible.”

== Capture ==
After that, Barquq led his army, accompanied by Ahmad, to the Levant to fight Timur. As they entered the Levant, news came that Timur had fled with his forces as he heard about the arrival of the Egyptian army.

Barquq ordered Ahmad to go back to Baghdad and wrote for him a letter declaring him the Sultan of Baghdad. He gave him five hundred thousand dirhams and many horses, camels, and cloth, as well as providing him with an Egyptian military force in support. When saying goodbye, Ahmad wanted to bow and kiss the ground at the feet of Barquq, but the latter did not allow him, out of respect, and instead he stood up, hugged him, and bid him farewell before they separated.
