= Dome of Saad al-Din bin Ghurab =

- قبة سعد الدين بن غراب

Religion
- Affiliation: Islam
- Patron: Saad al-Din bin Ghurab

Location
- Location: Darb al-Saqiya Street in the eastern Mamluk Desert in the Manshiyat Nasser neighborhood in Cairo
- Country: Egypt
- Coordinates: 30°02′37.6″N 31°16′28.7″E

Architecture
- Style: Mamluk architecture
- Completed: before 808 AH / 1406 AD

The Dome of Saad al-Din bin Ghurab (Egyptian Arabic: قبة سعد الدين بن غراب) also known as Dome of Ibn Ghurab. It was established by emir Saad al-Din Ibrahim bin Abd al-Raziq bin Ghurab al-Iskandarani during the Burji Mamluk era, before the year 808 AH/1406 AD, and it is located on Darb al-Saqiya Street in the eastern Mamluk Desert in the Manshiyet Nasser neighborhood in Cairo.

== See also ==
- Khanqah of Saad al-Din bin Ghurab
