= Amir Jamal al-Din al-Ustadar Mosque =

Mosque in Cairo, Egypt

- مسجد جمال الدين يوسف الاستادار
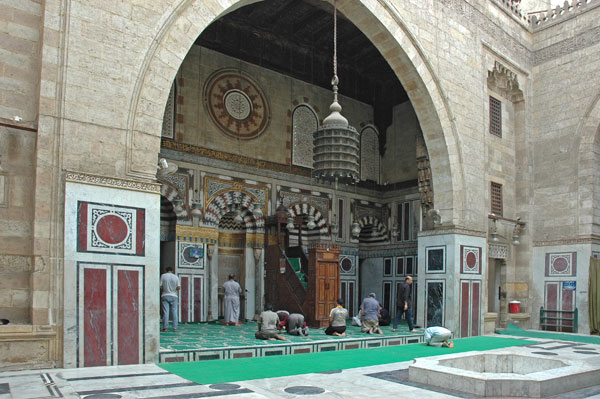
- Qibla wall of the mosque

Religion
- Affiliation: Islam
- Ecclesiastical or organisational status: Mosque-madrasa
- Status: Active

Location
- Location: Islamic Cairo
- Country: Egypt
- Interactive map of Amir Jamal al-Din al-Ustadar Mosque
- Coordinates: 30°03′03″N 31°15′48″E

Architecture
- Type: Mosque
- Style: Islamic; Mamluk
- Completed: 1407 CE

Specifications
- Dome: 1
- Minaret: 1

The Amir Jamal al-Din al-Ustadar Mosque (Arabic: مسجد جمال الدين يوسف الاستادار), also known as the Gamal al-Din Mosque, is a mosque-madrasa located on Al-Tambakshiya Street, in Islamic Cairo, Egypt. To the southeast of the mosque is Habas al-Rahb Street.

== History ==
The mosque was built in 1407 CE and dedicated to Emir Jamal al-Din al-Ustadar, who served under the Burji Mamluk Sultan An-Nasir Faraj. The building served as a madrasa which taught all four Islamic schools of jurisprudence. Renovation of the building was completed in 2001.

The architectural style of the mosque is greatly influenced by the Mosque-Madrassa of Sultan Barquq. Although Jamal al-Din was an influential patron of many buildings during his era, his career was tumultuous and he was not mourned after his execution by Sultan An-Nasir. At the same time, the Sultan had attempted to tear down this mosque, but it was prevented by the qadi by erasing the name of Jamal al-Din from the mosque.

== Gallery ==
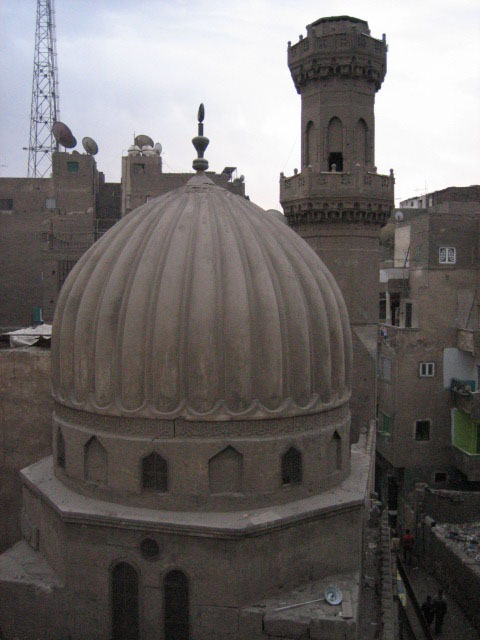
Dome and minaret

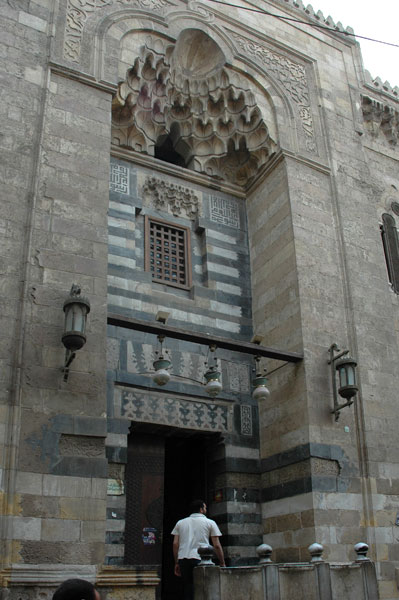
Iwan

== See also ==
- Islam in Egypt
- List of madrasas in Egypt
- List of mosques in Cairo
- List of Historic Monuments in Cairo
