= Maḥmūdīyah Library =

- مكتبة المحمودية
- Location: Cairo, Egypt
- Established: 1394-1395 CE (797 A.H.)

The Maḥmūdīyah Library, also known as the Maḥmūdīyah Madrasa Library, was established in Cairo, Egypt, in 1394-1395 CE (797 A.H.). It was the largest madrasa library in Mamluk Sultanate (now Egypt) and Syria, attracting prominent scholars with its rare and impressive collection of books.

== History ==
The library was founded by Jamal al-Din al-Ustadar, who dedicated the book as part of his measures to protect his property and wealth from seizure by the authorities. The original terms of endowment and staff positions for the Mahmoudiya Madrasah and its library are outlined in a now lost endowment deed.
