= Wikala of Qawsun =

- وكالة قوصون
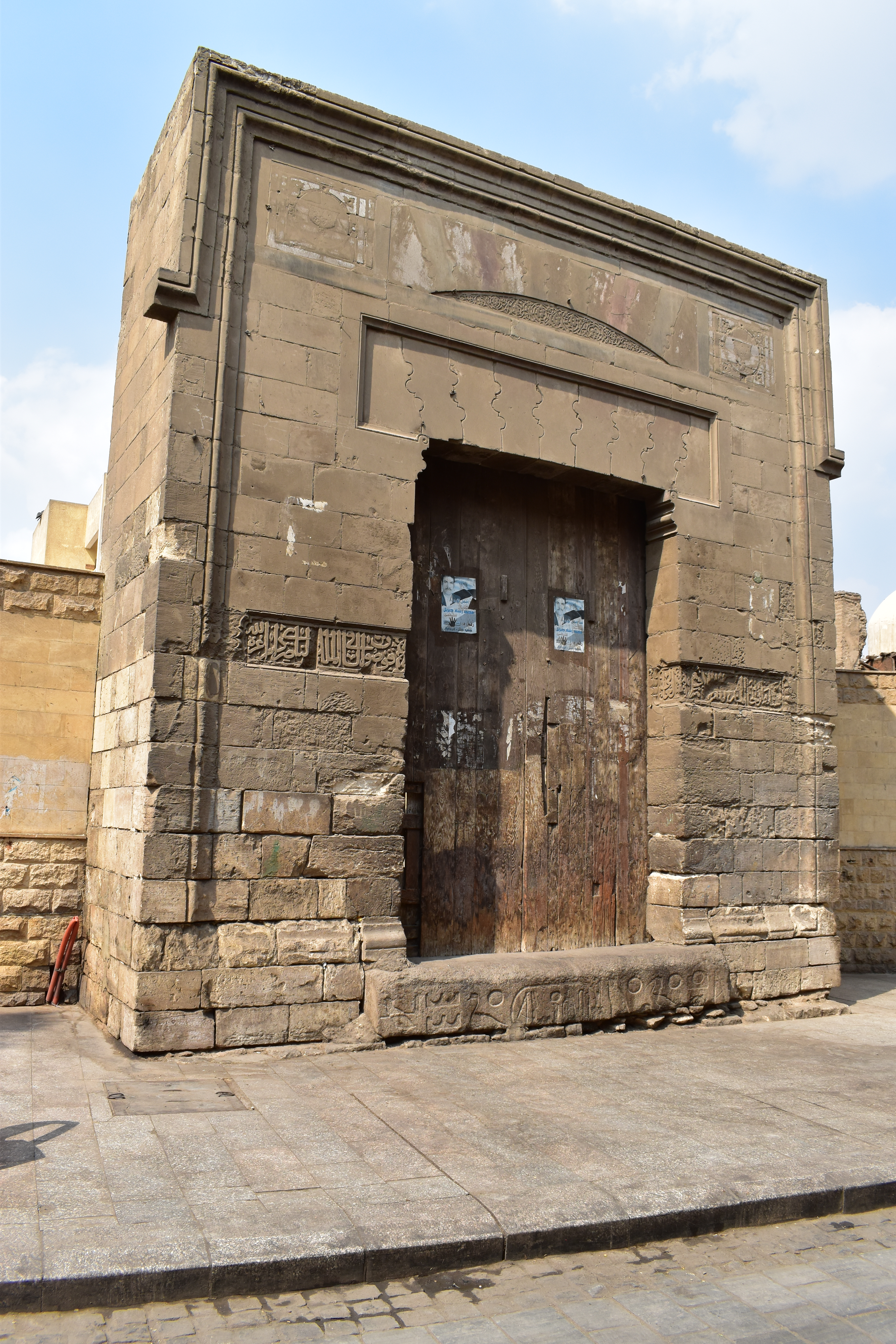
- Interactive map of the Wikala of Qawsun area
- Alternative names: Wikalat Qawsun, Khan al-Amir (Khan of the prince), Wikala of Soap

General information
- Type: Caravanserai
- Architectural style: Mamluk architecture
- Location: Cairo, Egypt
- Coordinates: 30°03′10.9″N 31°15′50.3″E
- Completed: 1341
- Demolished: 1960s
- Client: Qawsun

The Wikala of Qawsun (Egyptian Arabic: وكالة قوصون) or Khan of the prince (Egyptian Arabic: خان الأمير, romanized: Khan al-Amir). It was established by the Bahri Mamluk Emir (prince) Qawsun as-Saqi al-Nasiri, in the year 742 AH/1341 AD. It is located on Bab al-Nasr Street behind the Al-Hakim Mosque in the central Cairo neighborhood. This wikala has disappeared and nothing remains of its archaeological building except its main entrance, which preserves the founding text that includes the name of Prince Qawsun and his rank (رنك) which is the symbol of as-Saqi (cupbearer), and its symbol is the cup.

== History ==
This wikala on El-Gamaleya Street, the first such structure in Cairo, was constructed before 1341 AD/741 AH by the Amir Qawsun and was used by Nabulsi soap and coffee merchants during the 17th and 18th centuries, thus becoming known as the "Wikala of Soap." It was demolished in the 1960s to make way for a new school building, and only the portal of the original structure remains. This gate was moved slightly north and raised to current ground level when the remainder of the building was demolished. It is a square shape and has a fine blazon in the shape of a cup, as Qawsun was cup-bearer to Sultan al-Nasir Mahammad.
