= Beshtak Palace =

Qasr Bashtak (or Palace of Bashtak/Beshtak)
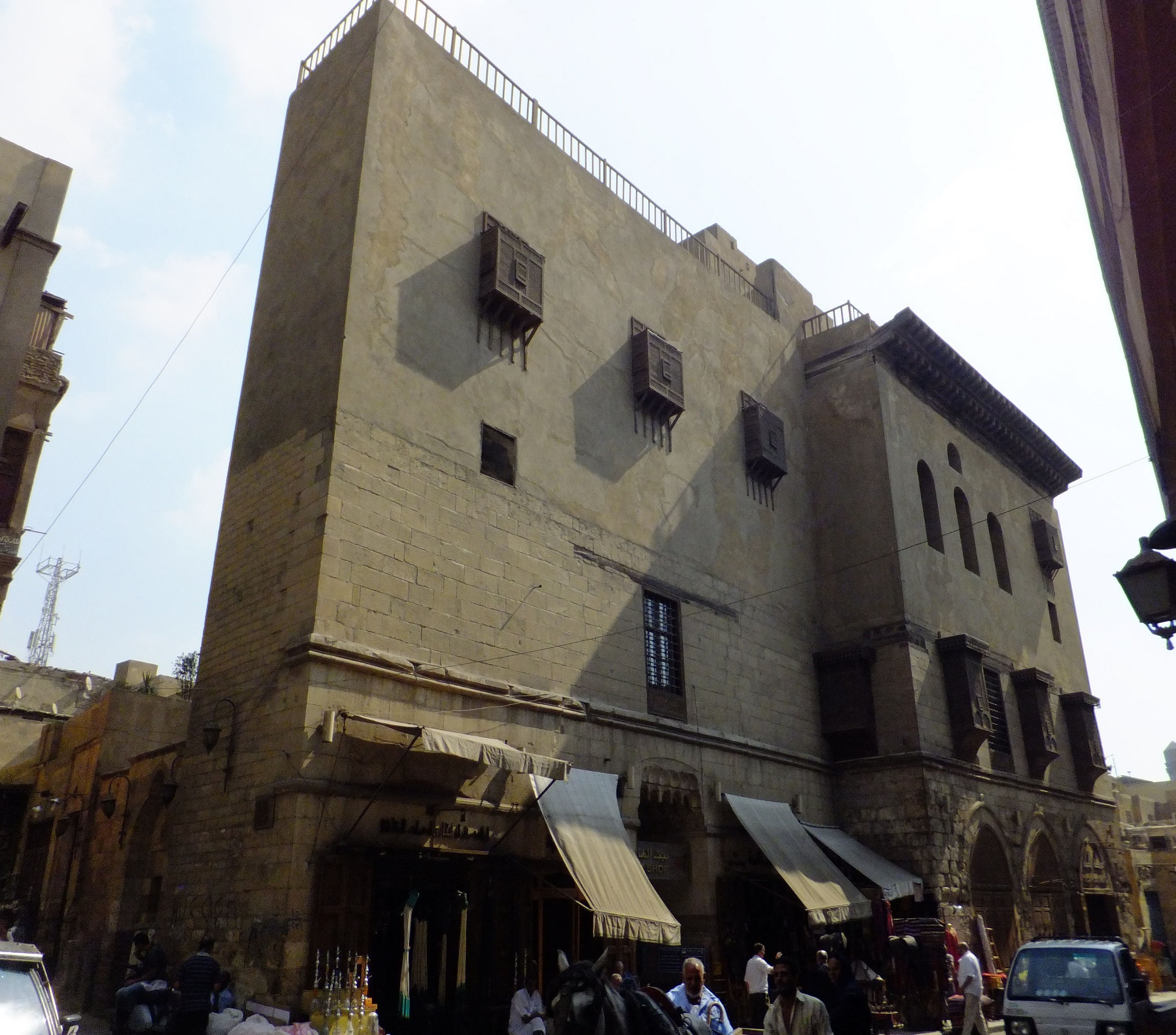
- The Bashtak palace at Bayn al-Qasrayn.

- Location of the Beshtak Palace in Egypt
- 30°03′02″N 31°15′41″E
- Location: Cairo, Egypt

History
- Built: 1334-1339
- Built for: (amir) Sayf al-Din Bashtak al-Nasiri

Site notes
- Governing body: Supreme Council of Antiquities

The Beshtak Palace or Qasr Bashtak ("Palace of Bashtak") is a historic palace and museum in Cairo, Egypt, built in the 14th century by the Mamluk amir Sayf al-Din Bashtak al-Nasiri. It is located on Shari'a al-Mu'izz (Muizz Street), in the area known as Bayn al-Qasrayn ("between the two palaces", in reference to the great Fatimid palaces that formerly stood here).

== History ==
In 1262, Sultan al-Zahir Baybars transferred parts of the Fatimid palaces of Cairo to the property of the state treasury, allowing thenceforth for the sale and redevelopment of property in this central area of the city. In 1334-1339, Bashtak, a powerful amir (i.e. an officer or lord in the Mamluk hierarchy) who was married to a daughter of Sultan al-Nasir Muhammad and held the prestigious court position of the Sultan's Master of the Robes, built a residence and stables over part of the Eastern Palace adjacent to the main street.

The remains of the palace were restored in 1983 by the German Archaeological Institute and constitute a rare surviving example of 14th century domestic architecture in Cairo.

== Description ==
Only part of the palace remains today. However, the edifice was originally five stories tall, and featured running water on all floors. Outside, at street level, the building had openings for shops whose revenues would have contributed to the amir's income, possibly following a model from Roman times. The most impressive surviving part of the palace is the large qa'a or reception hall. The hall features a coffered wooden ceiling, stucco windows of coloured glass, and a fountain of inlaid marble in the centre, which were decorative elements typical of the time and found in other buildings from the same era, like the nearby Mausoleum of Sultan Qalawun. The north and south sides of the hall also feature mashrabiyya (i.e. latticed wood screen) windows on the upper floors, allowing for women or other members of the household to privately watch events or festivities happening in the hall below.

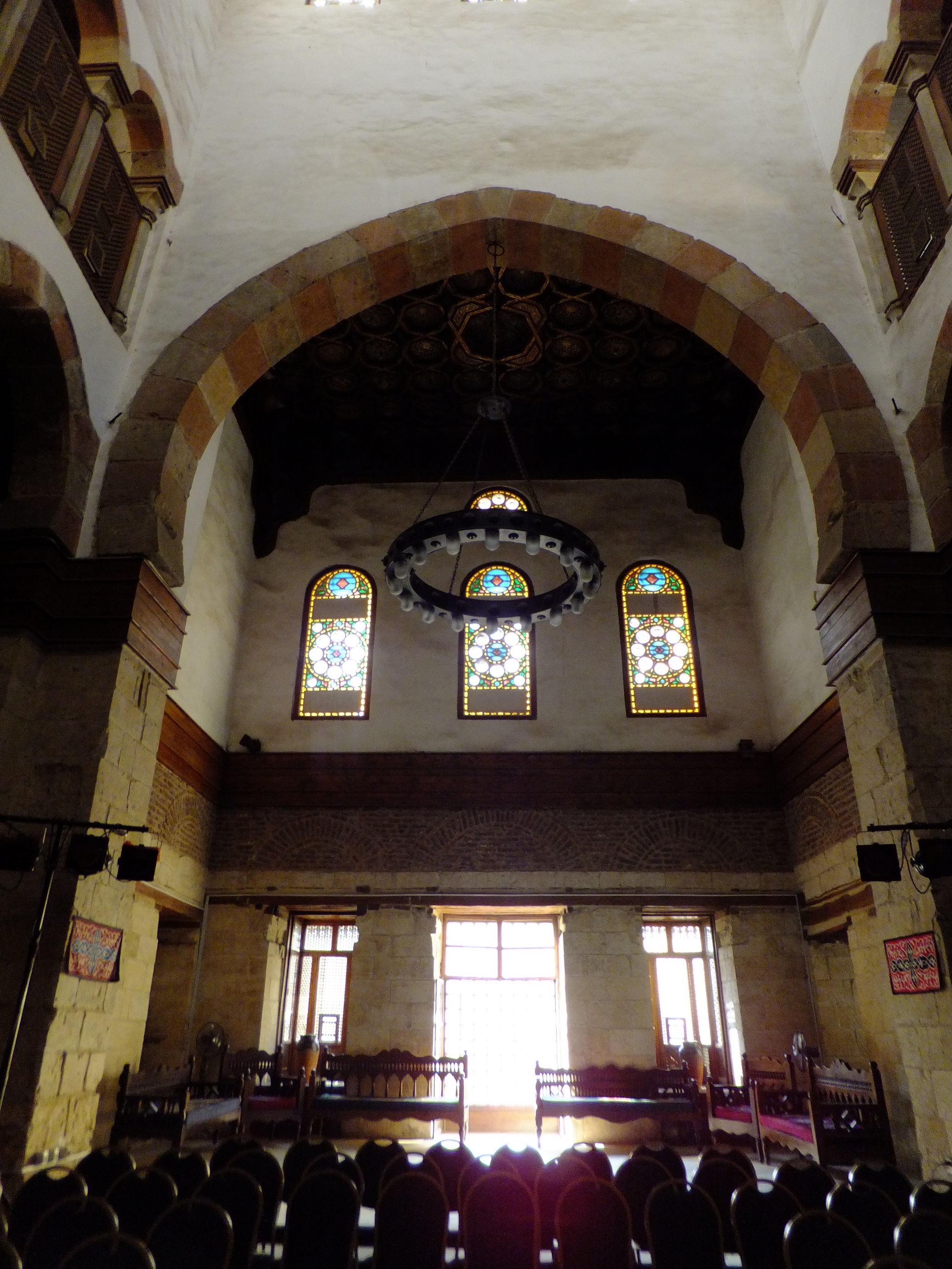
View of the qa'a (reception hall) of the Bashtak palace.

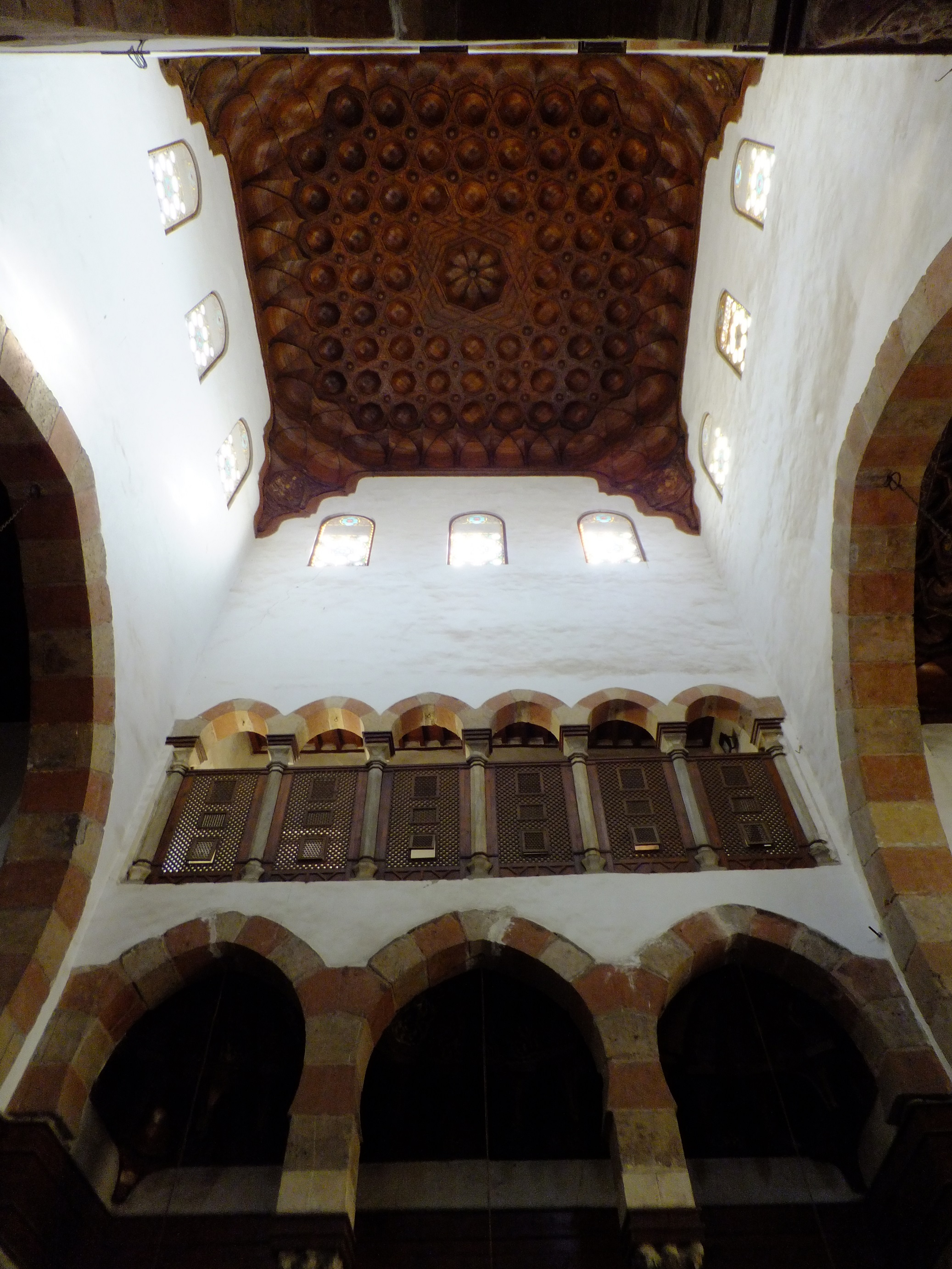
View of the ceiling of the qa'a (reception hall) of the Bashtak palace.

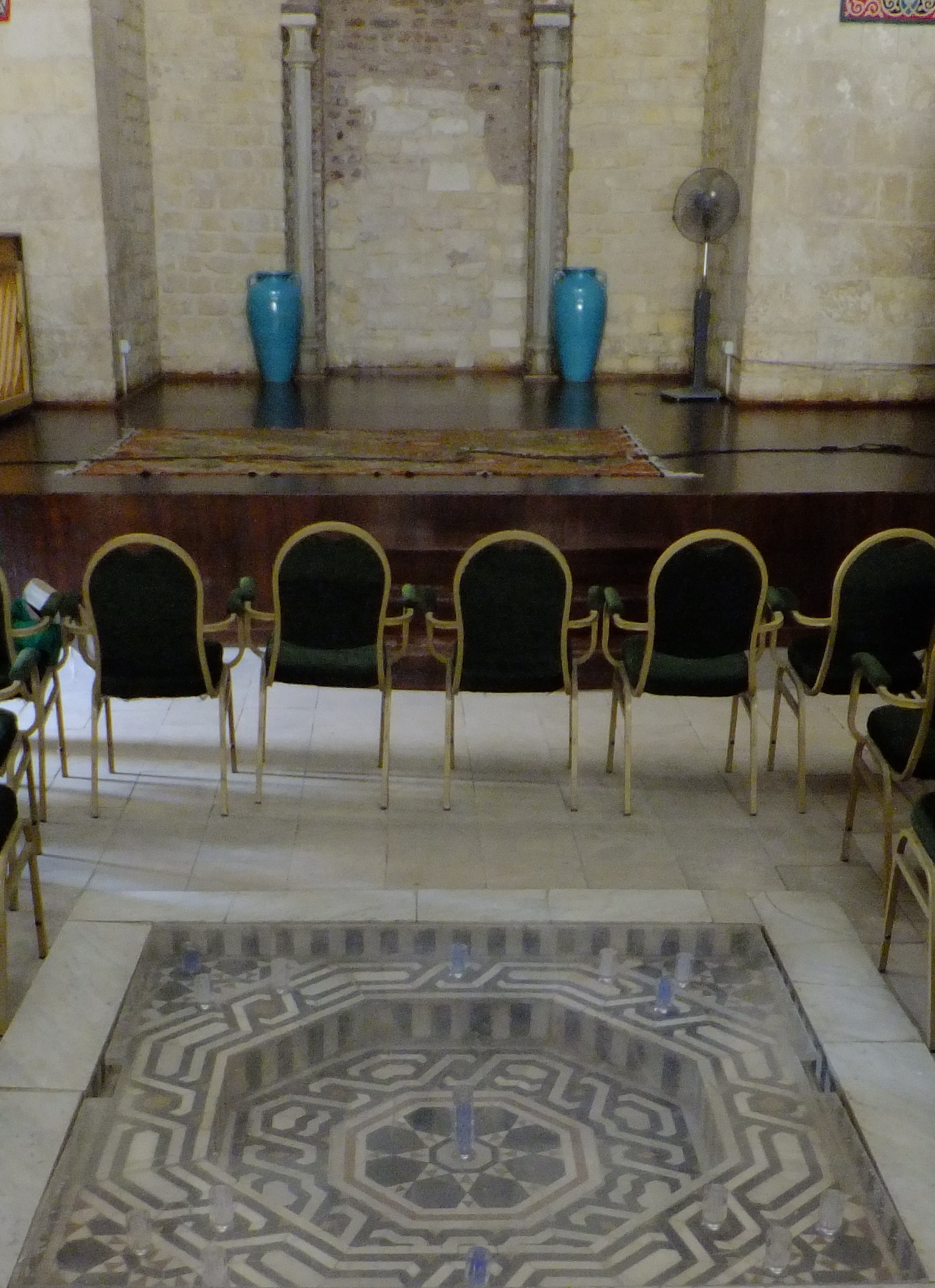
Marble fountain in the qa'a (reception hall) of the Bashtak palace.

== See also ==
- List of Historic Monuments in Cairo
- List of museums in Egypt
