= Khanqah of Saad al-Din bin Ghurab =

Khanqah-Sabil-Kuttab of Saad al-Din Ibrahim bin Ghurab
- خانقاه-سبيل-كتاب سعد الدين إبراهيم بن غراب
- Interactive map of Khanqah-Sabil-Kuttab of Saad al-Din Ibrahim bin Ghurab
- Alternative names: Khanqah-Sabil-Kuttab Saad al-Din bin Ghurab; Ribat Saad al-Din bin Ghurab; Madrasa Saad al-Din bin Ghurab

General information
- Type: Khanqah, Sabil, Kuttab
- Architectural style: Mamluk architecture
- Location: El-Gamamiz Street, Sayyida Zeinab neighborhood, Cairo, Egypt
- Coordinates: 30°02′12″N 31°14′56″E
- Client: Saad al-Din bin Ghurab

Khanqah-Sabil-Kuttab of Saad al-Din bin Ghurab (Egyptian Arabic: خانقاه-سبيل-كتاب سعد الدين بن غراب) was established by Judge Saad al-Din Ibrahim bin Abd al-Razzaq bin Ghurab al-Iskandarani during the Burji Mamluk era, between 1400 and 1406 AD (803–808 AH). It is located on Darb el-Gamamiz Street in the Sayyida Zeinab neighborhood in Cairo. Its layout consists of an irregular rectangular area, in the middle of which is an open court surrounded by four iwans, the largest of which is the Qibla iwan, and a group of Sufi retreats were attached to it.

== See also ==
- Dome of Saad al-Din bin Ghurab
