= Maristan of al-Mu'ayyad =

Maristan of Sultan al-Mu'ayyad Sheikh
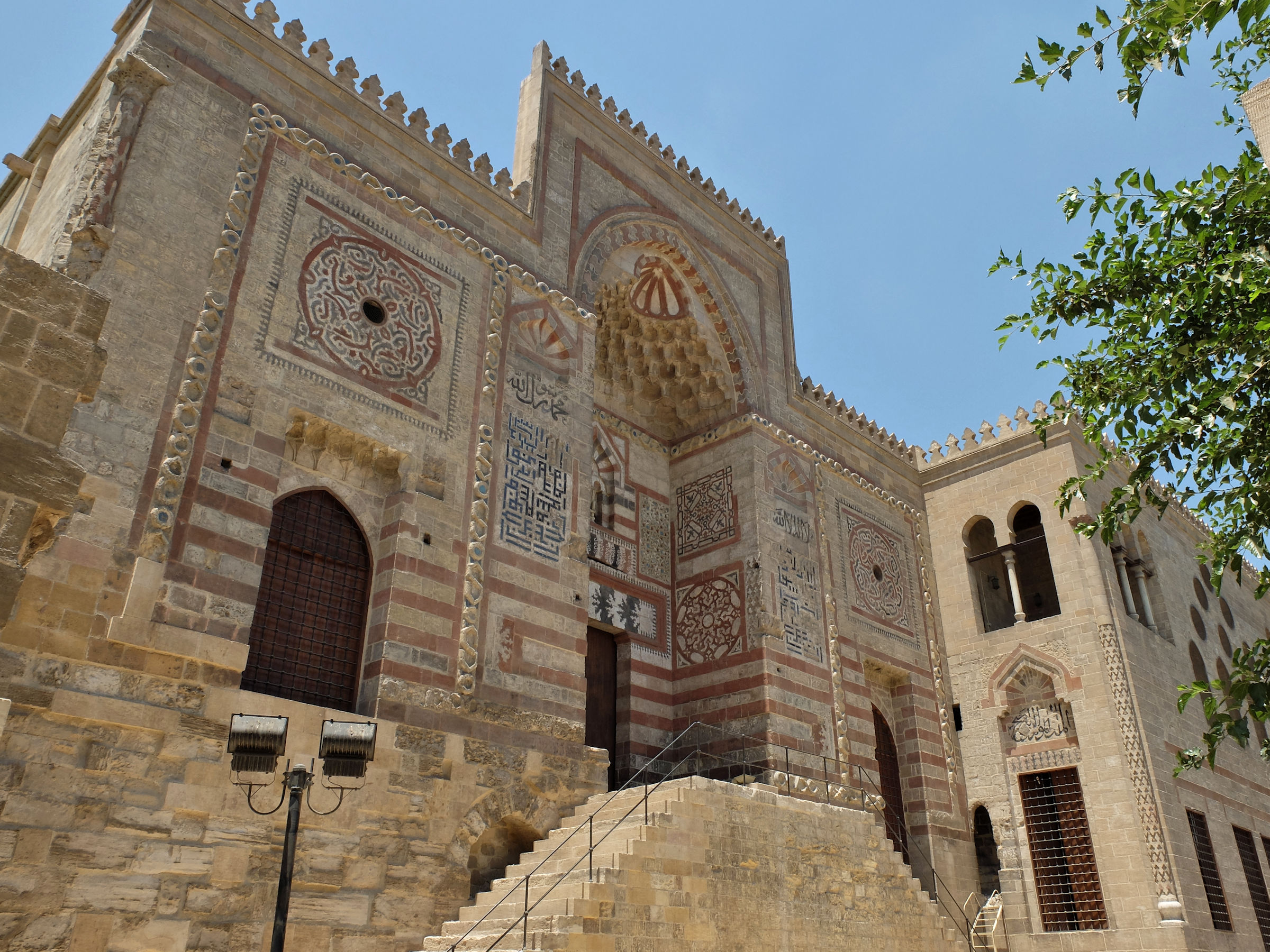
- Monumental facade of the maristan.

General information
- Type: bimaristan (hospital)
- Architectural style: Mamluk, Islamic
- Location: Sekat al Komi, al-Darb al-Ahmar, Cairo, Egypt
- Coordinates: 30°01′58″N 31°15′34″E
- Construction started: 1418
- Completed: 1420
- Renovated: early 21st century

Technical details
- Material: stone

The Maristan of al-Mu'ayyad or Bimaristan al-Mu'ayyadi is a bimaristan (hospital; also called maristan) constructed by the Mamluk sultan al-Mu'ayyad Sheikh between 1418 and 1420. It is located on the southern edge of the Darb al-Ahmar district in Cairo, Egypt, near the Citadel of Cairo and the former Bab al-Wazir gate. It did not serve its function as hospital very long and stood ruined for many years. Its facade and main walls have survived, and have been recently restored.

== History ==
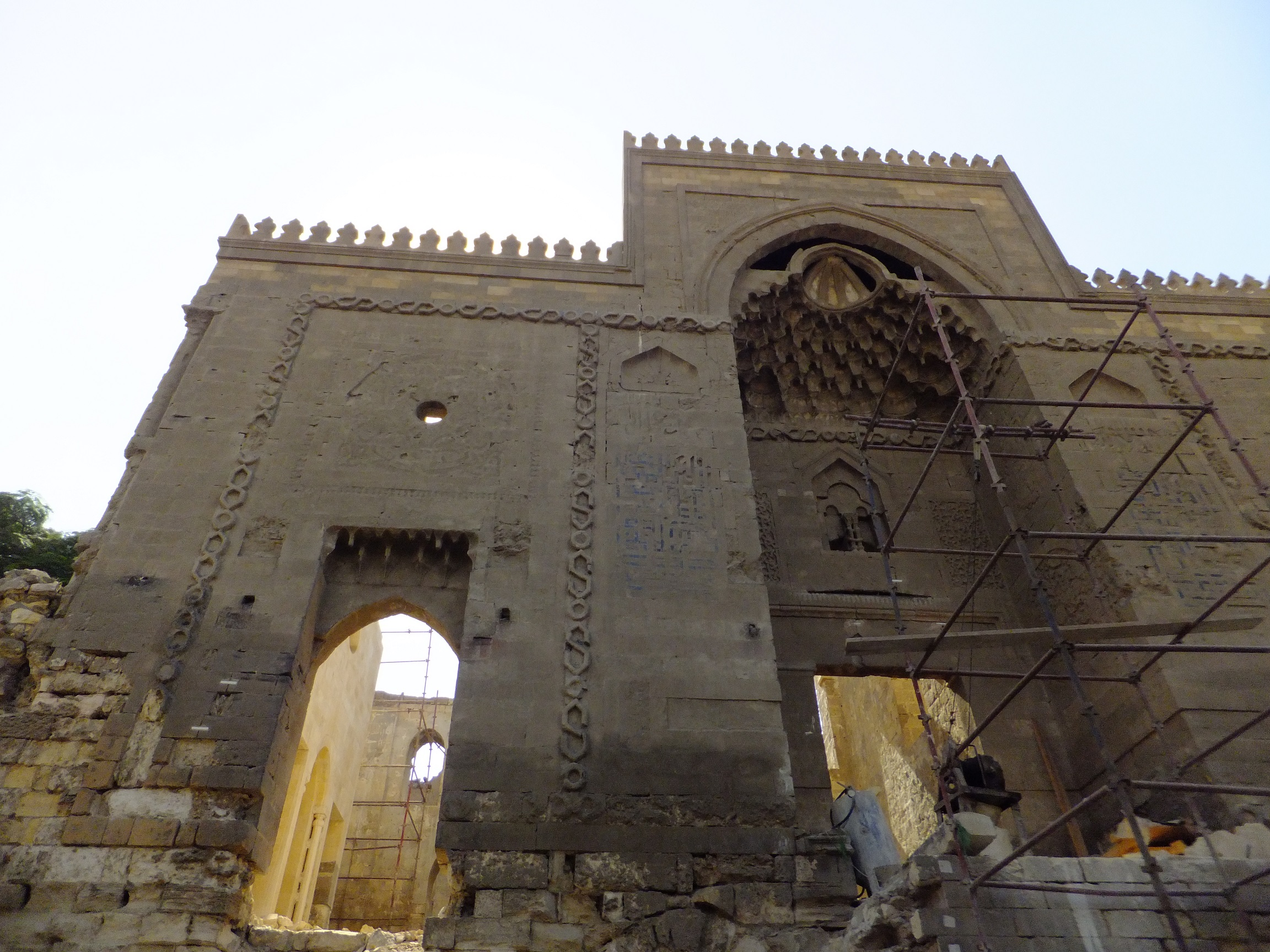
The maristan of al-Mu'ayyad (photographed in 2012) before recent restoration.

The maristan was built on the site of the unfinished madrasa-mausoleum of Sultan al-Ashraf Sha'ban. Sha'ban had started building a monumental and lavishly decorated mausoleum and madrasa for himself in 1375 but the building was still unfinished when he was assassinated in 1377. Since his mausoleum was incomplete, he was instead buried in the second mausoleum of the madrasa he had built to honour his mother (the Madrasa of Umm al-Sultan Sha'ban), which is located further down the main street in the Darb al-Ahmar neighbourhood. The unfinished structure was eventually dismantled by Sultan Faraj ibn Barquq in 1411 in order to reuse its materials for a number of other buildings, including the so-called Zawiya of Faraj ibn Barquq (located in front of Bab Zuweila) and the madrasa-mosque of his emir Jamal al-Din Ustadar.

Sultan Faraj was assassinated in 1412 by rebellious Mamluk amirs and Mu'ayyad Sheikh eventually succeeded to the throne, reigning from 1412 to 1421. He was known as a relatively humble and pious ruler who spent little on himself. Nonetheless, he managed to erect many religious and secular buildings (including a large mosque) despite the unsettled political situation and the economic difficulties of Egypt at the time. He appropriated the site of Sha'ban's madrasa and built this maristan, even though a large bimaristan institution already existed as part of Sultan Qalawun's earlier complex at Bayn al-Qasrayn further north. It is likely that the foundations of Sha'ban's demolished religious complex were reused for the maristan, as the building's floor plan is aligned with the qibla (the direction of prayer). Parts of the unfinished madrasa's walls, which were reportedly very tall and impressive, were possibly also reused. If so, this may also explain why this maristan building was equally monumental and impressive, which was rare for such a civic building.

Construction of the building began in July 1418 and was completed in August 1420. The famous Egyptian historian Maqrizi was present to see the construction. Unfortunately, al-Mu'ayyad died of illness the following year in 1421, before the building was able to properly begin its function as a hospital/maristan. In fact, it reportedly did not even provide services during the plague outbreak of 1419–1420. For a year, the building was inhabited by a group of Iranians then used by the Mamluk court as a guesthouse for ambassadors. In March 1422, under the reign of Sultan al-Ashraf Barsbay, the building was turned into a Friday mosque (for which it was already well-suited, given its qibla alignment). Part of the foundation's failure to serve its intended function may be due to a lack of information and instructions outlined in the documents of its waqf (a charitable trust in Islamic law). The waqf document briefly described the maristan but provided no instructions for how the space should be used, what services should be offered, or what staff should operate it (in contrast with the highly detailed waqf documents of Qalawun's older maristan, which continued to operate even up to modern times). As a typical Mamluk foundation of this sort, the descendants of al-Mu'ayyad were also entitled to keep any income from the endowments which financed the foundation. As a result, they may have had an interest in cutting out operational costs for the hospital. Barsbay likely established a new endowment and trust for the conversion and operation of the building to a mosque.

Over time, the building fell into disuse and then into ruin. Only its monumental facade and the walls of its main hall remained standing. It only received some attention In recent years. In 2005, the Supreme Council of Antiquities demolished some of the structures in front of the building to allow an unobstructed view of the facade. In the following years, the building was restored by the government as part of the Historic Cairo Restoration Project.

== Description ==
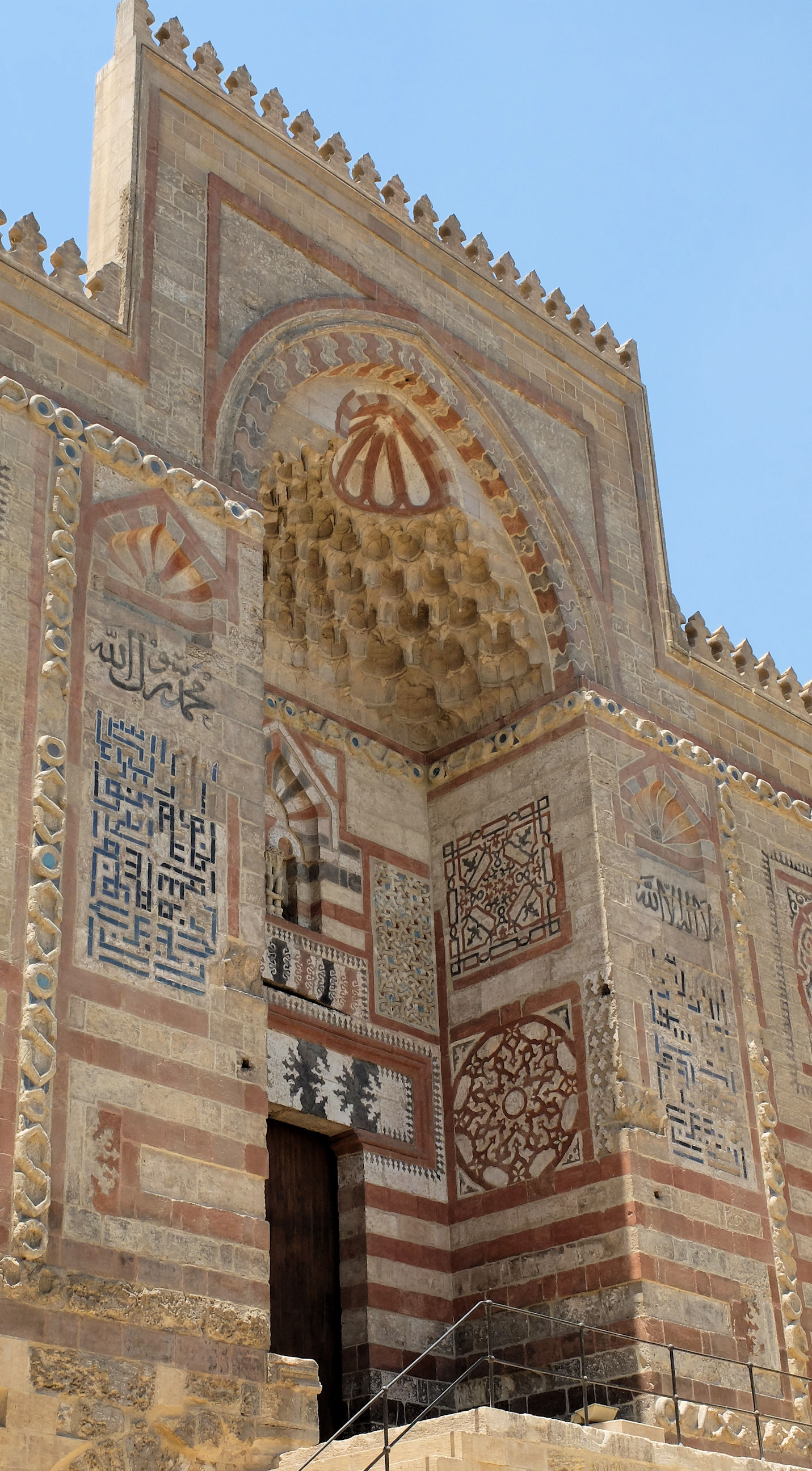
Entrance portal of the maristan.

The monumental building, despite falling into ruin over the years, is nonetheless one of the most impressive structures in historic Cairo. What remains today is mostly the facade and the walls of the main hall; the upper floors and interior of the building collapsed or disappeared some time ago, along with some other outlying structures. The building is located on higher ground than most of the surrounding area. Its entrance is located on its southeastern side, facing northeast. This entrance leads to a vestibule, which then leads to a large courtyard or main hall around which the northwestern part of the building is centered.

=== Exterior facade ===
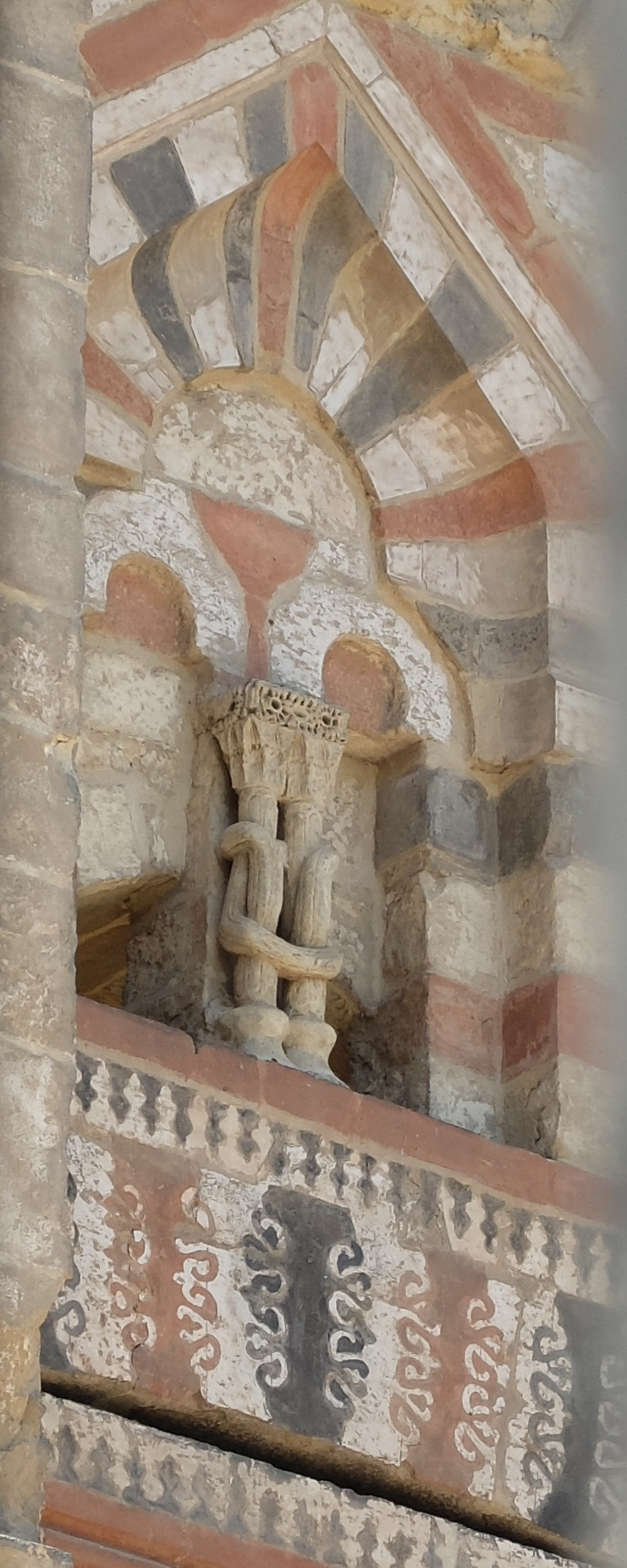
The unusual snake carvings around the columns of a window above the entrance.

The maristan is set in an elevated position relative to the street in front of it and its entrance was originally reached by a spiral staircase (replaced by a regular staircase today). A sabil used to exist near the entrance, as did a school for orphans and a small mosque or oratory.

The frontal facade is tall and imposing, and features a surprising richness of ornamentation and colour. Both here, on the exterior, and around the arches of the main hall/courtyard, are bands of carved stone that look like linked chains and serve to frame various elements of the architectural composition. The entrance is set within a monumental recessed portal crowned by a vault or canopy of muqarnas (stalactite-like carvings) within a rectangular frame that projects higher than the rest of the building's facade; all of which is typical of Mamluk architecture. The overall facade makes use of ablaq masonry (alternating dark red and light stone) masonry, but more elaborate ablaq patterns appear above the doorway. On both lateral (side) walls of the portal are two "roundels" of differing floral and geometric compositions created using red stone. Outside the portal, two even larger roundel patterns of this kind appear above the windows on either side of the portal. Between these and the portal are keel-shaped niches (originating from Fatimid architecture) with radiating red and light stone, below which are inscriptions in Arabic (in either thuluth or naskhi forms), formed with red paste or stone, which together appear to form the shahada. Further below these inscriptions are panels of "Square" Kufic script, formed with inlaid lapis lazuli blue tiles. One unusual detail is also found above the doorway: here, set along the middle of a double window, are two small decorative columns with carved snakes wrapping around them, which could be a symbol of healing.

=== Interior ===
The interior was ruined over time and little remains of the original structure other than the bare walls of the main halls, although it has recently been repaired and restored. Aside from the vestibule at the entrance, the interior is dominated by a rectangular central courtyard surrounded on four sides by iwans (chambers open on one side) that open though massive pointed arches framed by a band of carved stone (as mentioned above) resembling linked chains. The outer walls of the southwestern and northeastern iwans are distinguished by an unusually extensive arrangement of windows: four rectangular windows at the bottom, above which are four arched windows, above which in turn are six round windows stacked in a triangular formation. One set of these windows is visible on the outside of the building (in the section to the right of the main entrance). The original roofs of the building were made of timber (wood).

Beyond this, some of the building's original layout is known from the waqf documentation. The main courtyard had a central basin of water. Two of the iwans had wall fountains (shadirvans) from which water flowed down to the basin via small water channels in the floor (something also found in a courtyard of the maristan of Qalawun, and elsewhere in Islamic architecture). The other chambers of the complex included a ward for female patients, an oratory or prayer room, a pharmacy, and a kitchen. There was an upper floor with a number of rooms as well as a loggia or balcony.

== See also ==
- Bimaristan
- Medicine in the medieval Islamic world
- Maristan, madrasa and mausoleum of Sultan Qalawun
- Mamluk architecture
- Mosque of Sultan al-Mu'ayyad
