= Joseph-Philibert Girault de Prangey =

French Photographer

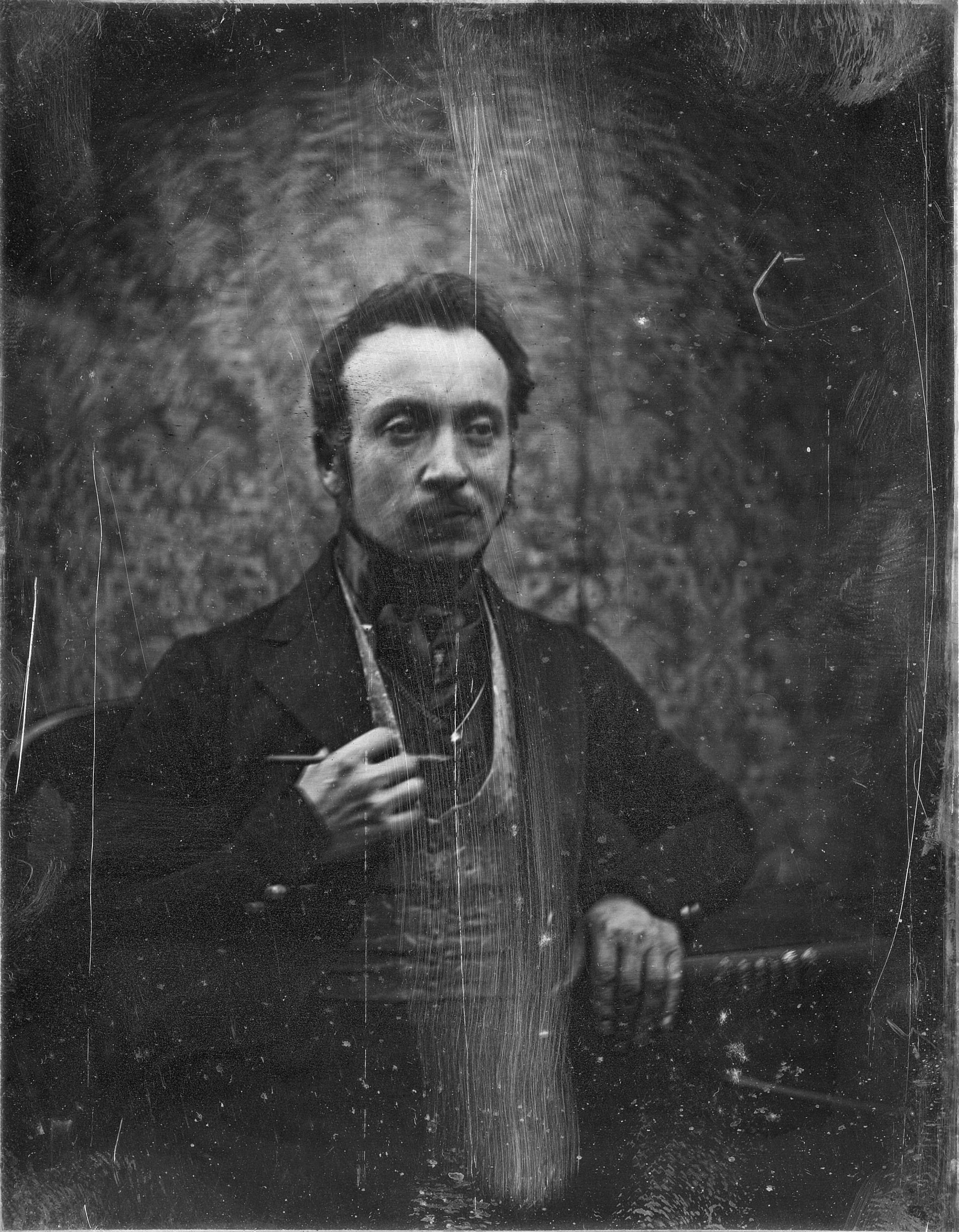
Joseph-Philibert Girault de Prangey, 1840 self-portrait

Joseph-Philibert Girault de Prangey (21 October 1804 – 7 December 1892) was a French scholar and draughtsman whose use of photography while he was active in the Middle East pursuing archaeology and studying ancient architecture has made him recognized as an important early photographer. His daguerreotypes are the earliest surviving photographs of Greece, Palestine, Italy, Egypt, Syria, and Turkey. After his death in 1892, his carefully stored photographs were discovered in the attic of his estate in the 1920s and they only became known as important works eighty years later.

== Career ==
Girault de Prangey was a wealthy scholar who studied painting in Paris at the École des Beaux-Arts and traveled as he pursued historical archaeology as an amateur. He learned daguerreotypy, possibly from its inventor, Louis Daguerre, or from Hippolyte Bayard. Girault de Prangey was keenly interested in the architecture of the Middle East. His artwork always included highly detailed focus upon architecture. He recognized that photography was a tool that could enable him to be even more accurate in his artwork. Between 1841 and 1844, he made a grand tour that included Italy and the countries of the eastern Mediterranean, producing more than 900 daguerreotypes of architectural views, landscapes, and portraits of residents he encountered in their cultural settings.

After his return to France, he made watercolour and pen-and-ink studies using his photographs and published a small-edition book of lithographs from them. Responses to the publication failed to encourage further publication of his artwork and he turned his concentration to his interest in the study of exotic plants at his estate. He made stereographs of his estate and the exotic plants he collected. Photography was not considered an art form during his lifetime. Being tools for his artwork, he made no effort to make his photographs known during his lifetime, and after using them for his artwork, stored them in wooden boxes in his attic.

== Legacy ==
Once the importance of his photography was known, his work was able to command high prices in the art world. In May 2003, Sheikh Saud Al Thani of Qatar purchased a daguerreotype by Joseph-Philibert Girault de Prangey for a world-record price of £565,250 or $922,488.

On 30 January 2019, the Metropolitan Museum of Art opened "Monumental Journey: The Daguerreotypes of Girault de Prangey". Approximately 120 photographs that the amateur archaeologist created in Greece, Egypt, Syria, Turkey, and the Levant during a self-financed tour of the region in the early 1840s were presented. They included the Parthenon in Athens, the Khayrbak Mosque in Cairo, and the Dome of the Rock in Jerusalem. Organized with the Bibliothèque Nationale de France in Paris, it was the first comprehensive exhibition in America devoted to the photography of the French artist.

== Gallery ==
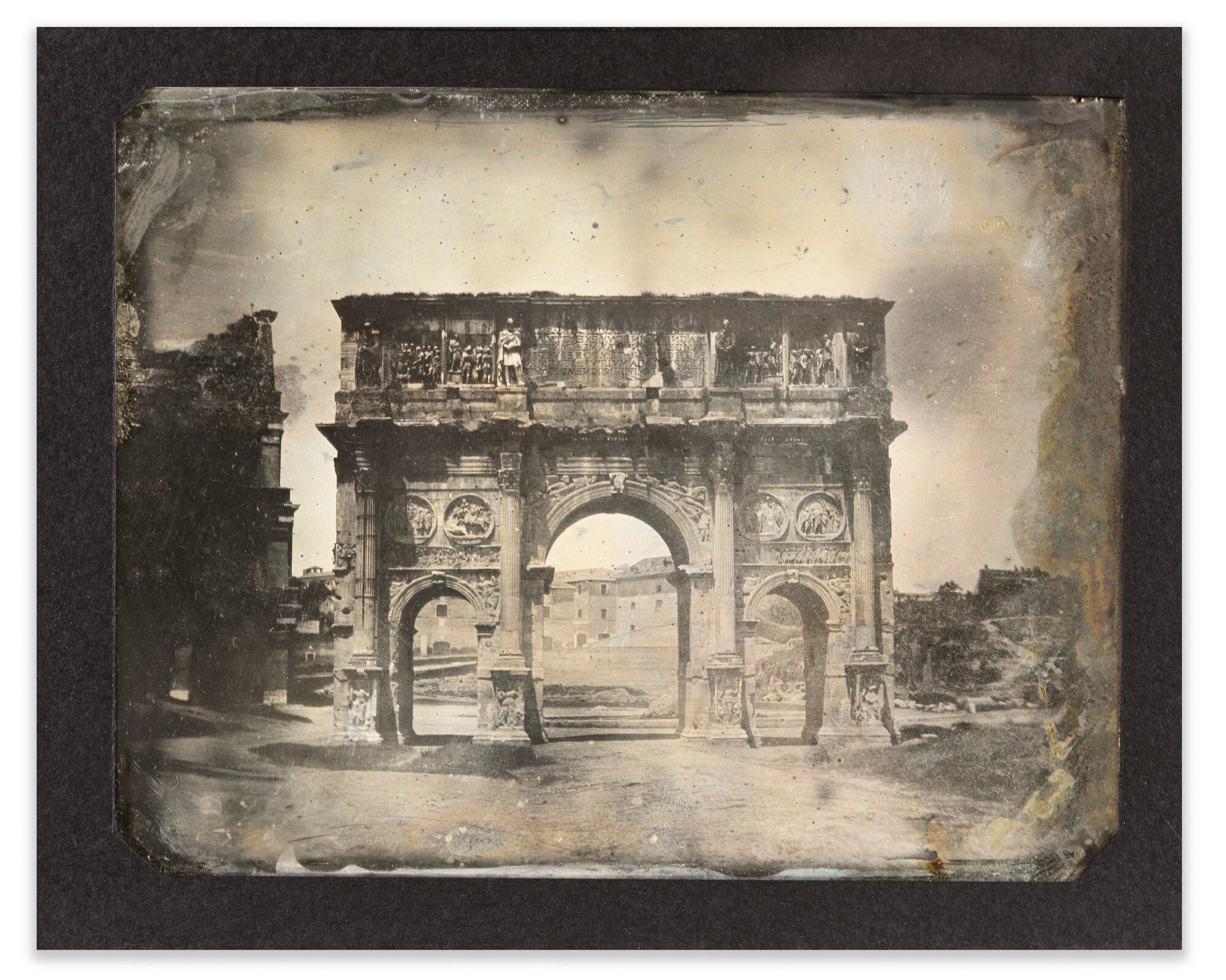
The arch of Constantine, 1842

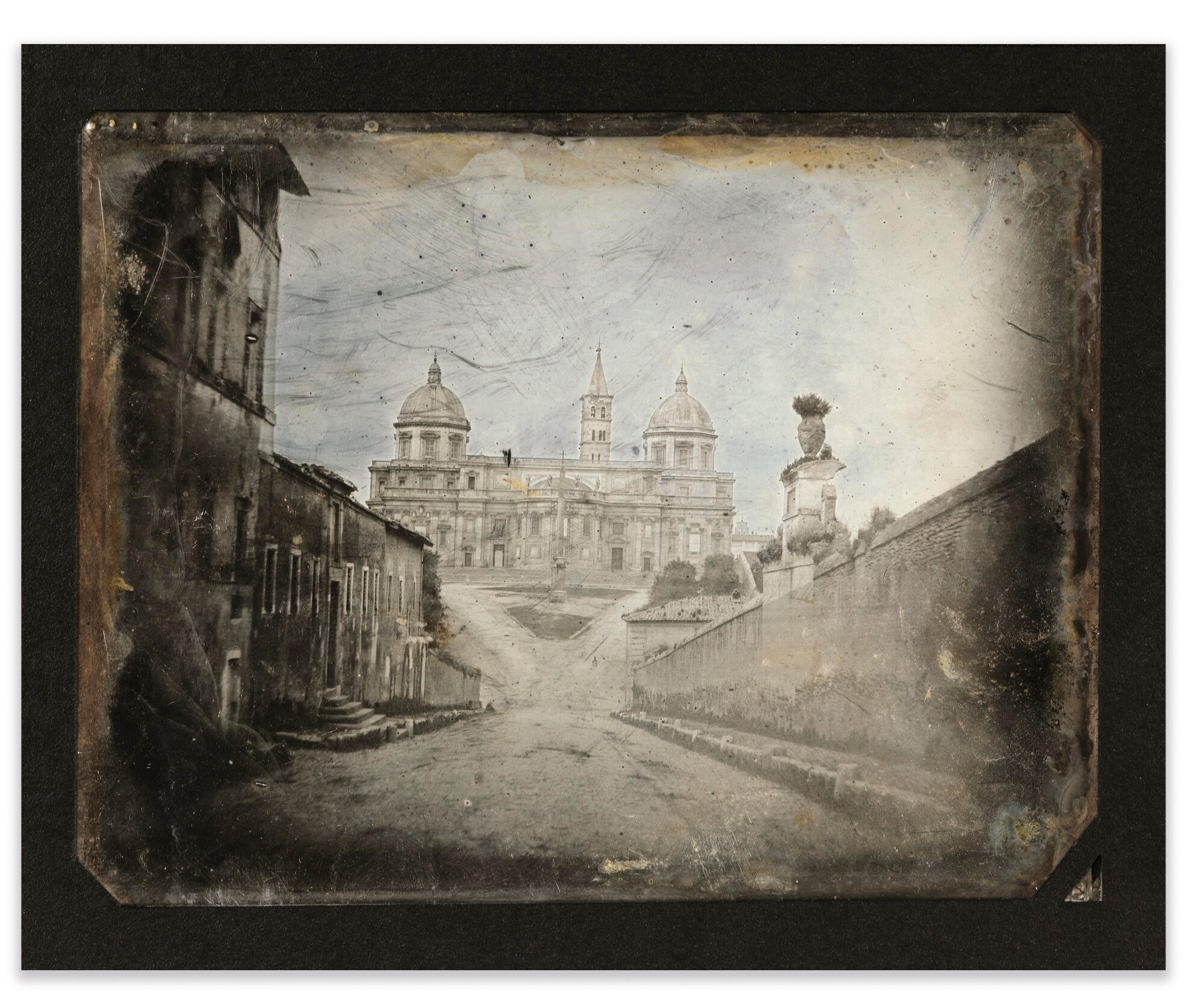
Santa Maria Maggiore, Rome, 1842

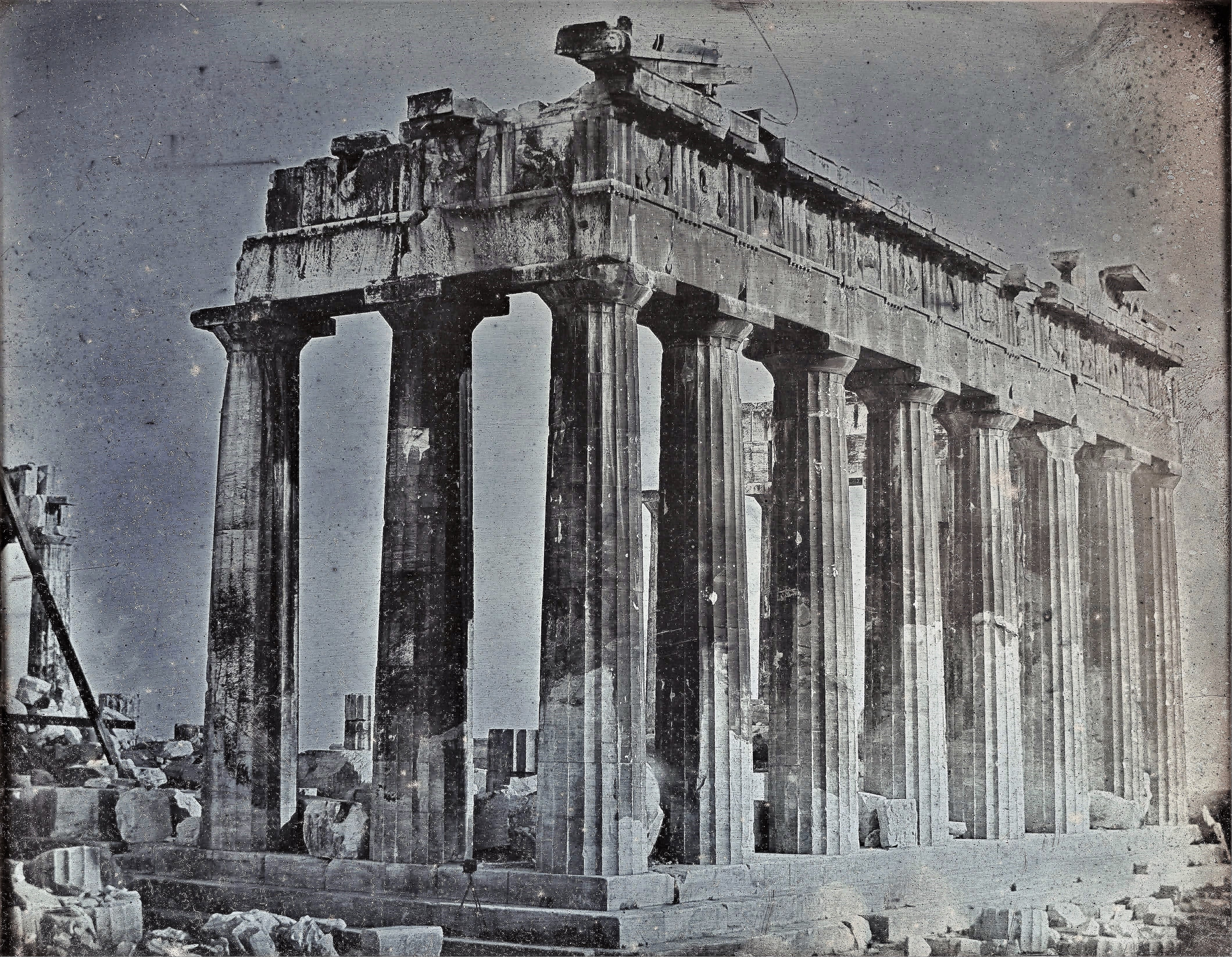
Part of the Acropolis, 1842

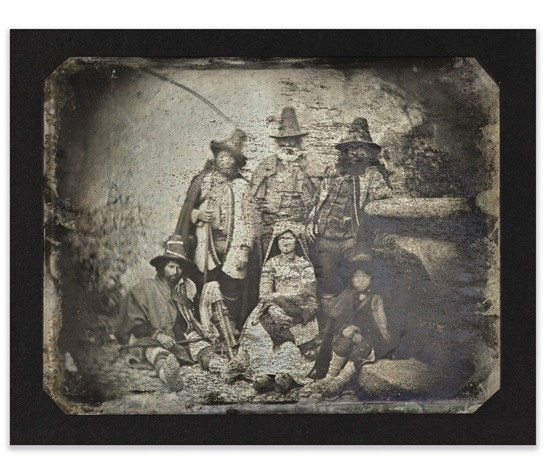
Piferari, 1842

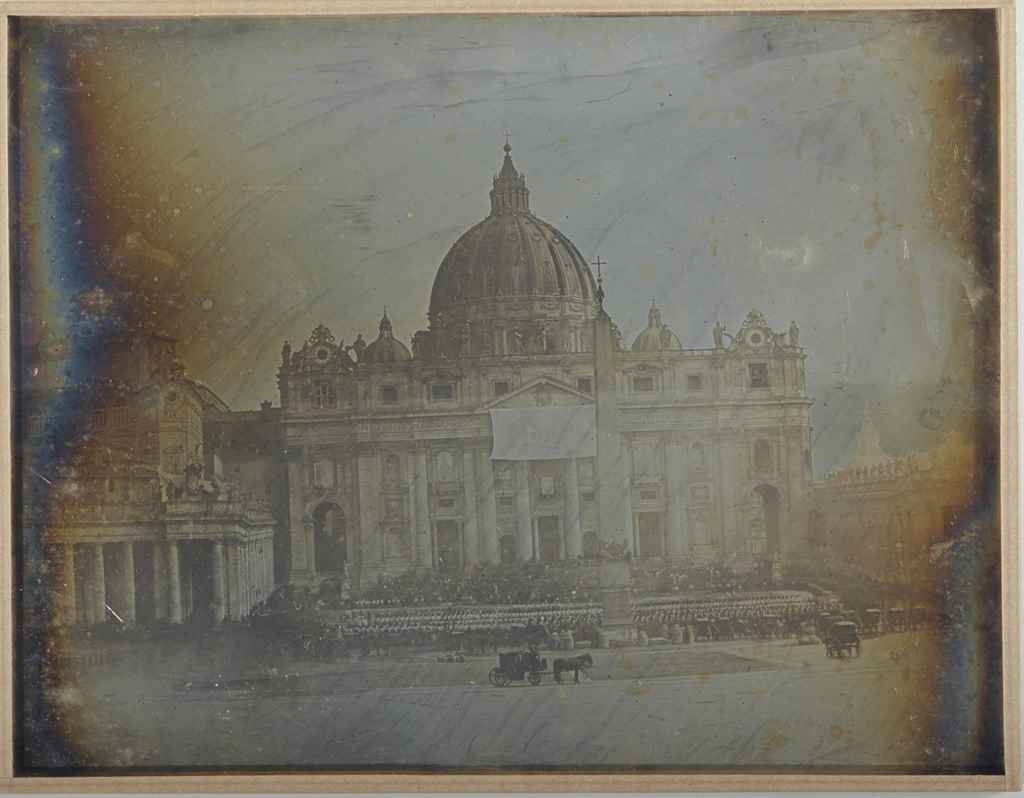
St Peter's Basilica, 1842

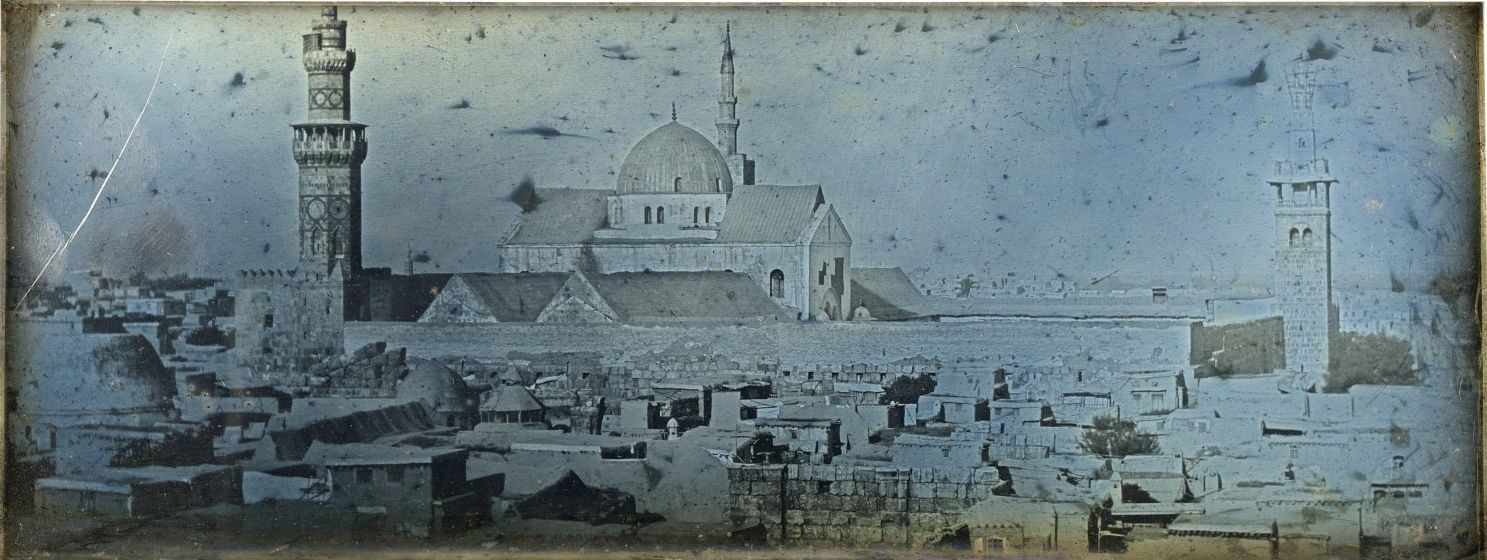
Old City of Damascus and the Umayyad Mosque, 1843

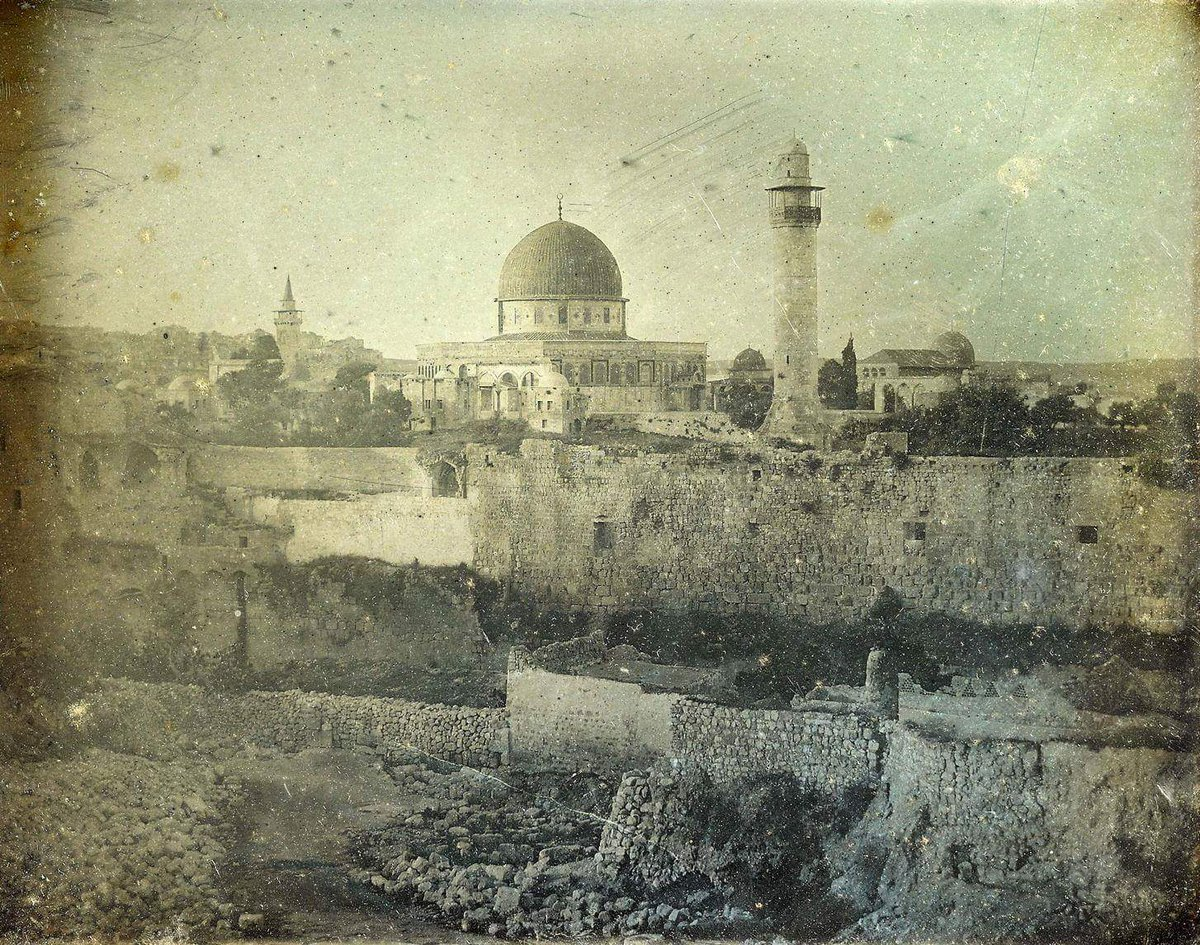
Dome of the Rock in Al-Aqsa, Jerusalem, 1844
