= Mosque and Mausoleum of Amir Ahmad al-Mihmandar =

Mosque in Cairo, Egypt

Coordinates: 30°02′26.4″N 31°15′34.7″E

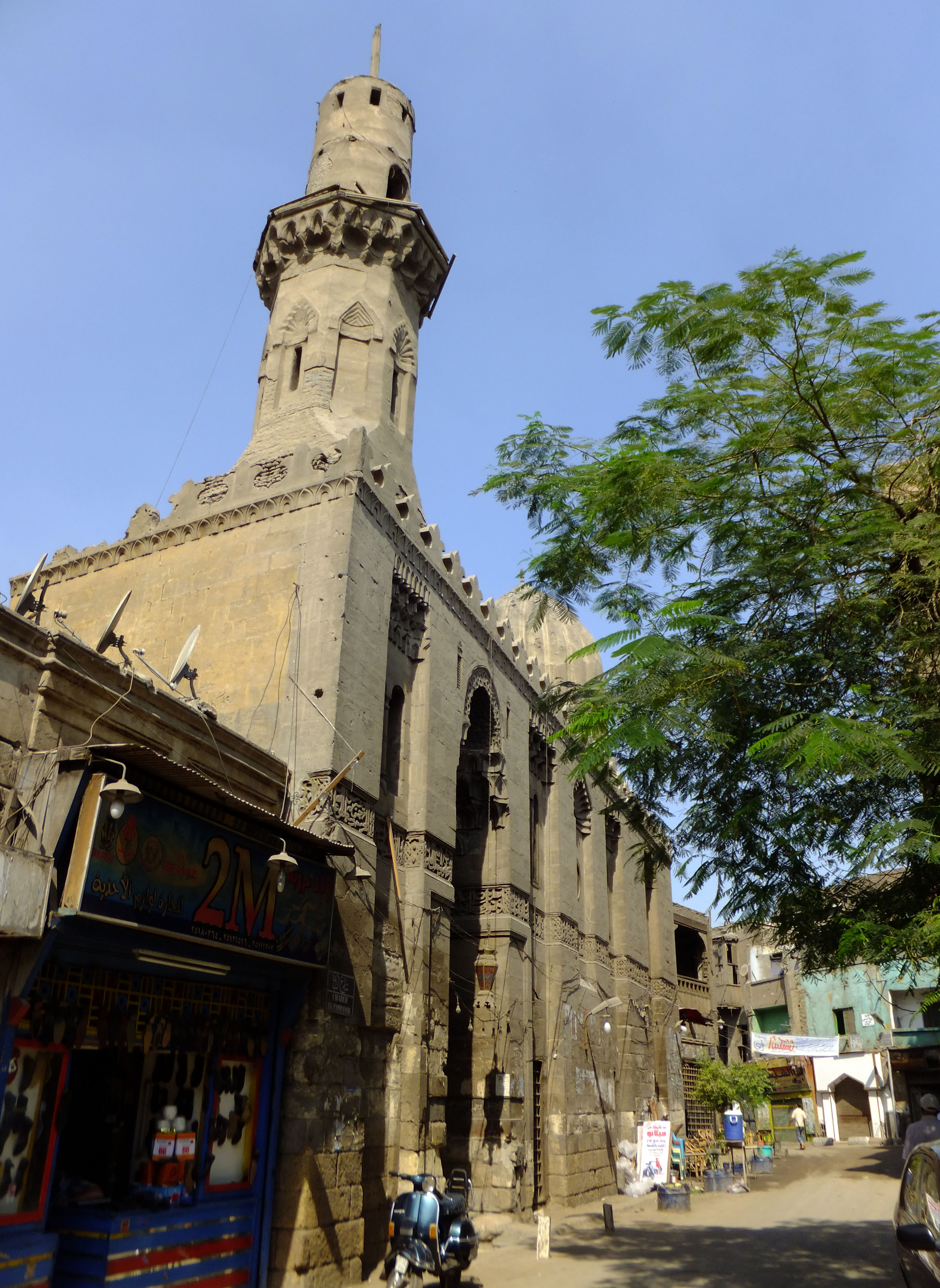
The mosque and mausoleum, seen from the street

The Mosque and Mausoleum of Amir Ahmad al-Mihmandar which is also referred to as the al-Mihmandariyya college (madrasa) (Arabic: المدرسة المهمندارية, romanized: al-Madrasa al-Mihmandārīya)was founded during the third reign of al-Nasir Muhammad in the area of Darb al-Ahmar in Cairo, Egypt.

== Founder ==
This institution was founded by the amir Ahmad al-Mihmandar (Arabic: أمير شهاب الدين أحمد بن آقوش العزيزي المهمندار, romanized: Amīr Shihāb al-Dīn Aḥmad ibn Aqūsh al-ʾAzīzī al-Mihmandār). He held the position of naqib al-jaysh (Arabic: نقيب الجيوش, romanized: naqīb al-jaysh), which was similar to chief of military police.

== Historical background ==
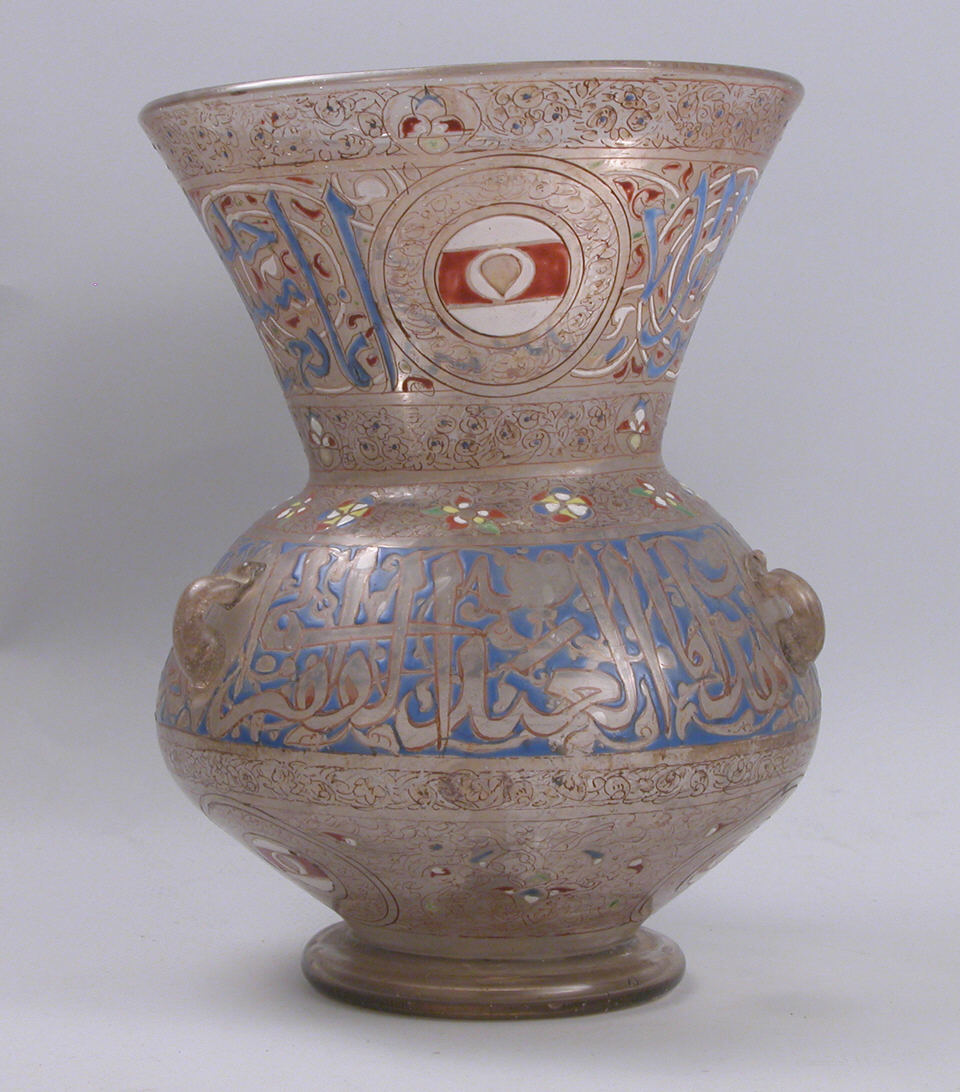
Mosque Lamp of Amir Ahmad al-Mihmandar

The complex was built in the month of Muharram 725 AH/1324-5 CE. According to al-Maqrizi, it included a college (madrasa), that included instruction in the Hanafi legal school four students, and a Sufi hospice (khanqah). The founder also built a market (qaysariyya) and an apartment complex (rab') that were still there during al-Maqrizi's time.
