= Mosque of Aslam al-Silahdar =

Mosque in Cairo, Egypt

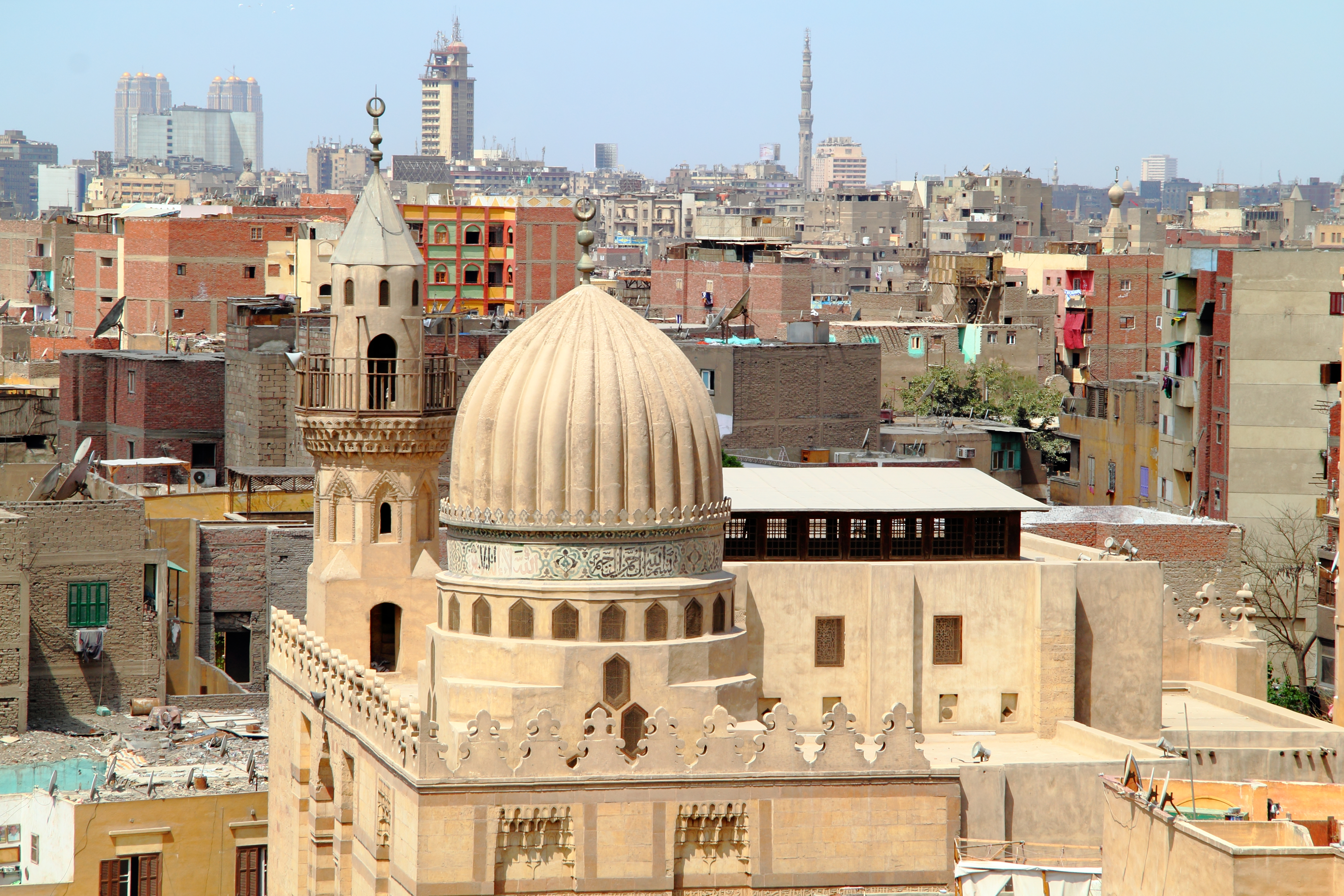

Religion
- Affiliation: Islam

Location
- Location: Al-Darb al-Ahmar, Cairo, Egypt
- Interactive map of Mosque of Aslam al-Silahdar
- Coordinates: 30.040528°N 31.261975°E

Architecture
- Type: Mosque, mausoleum
- Style: Mamluk
- Founder: Aslam al-Baha'i al-Silahdar
- Groundbreaking: 1344
- Completed: 1345

Specifications
- Dome: 1
- Minaret: 1

The Mosque of Aslam al-Silahdar is a 14th-century mosque and mausoleum in the Al-Darb al-Ahmar neighbourhood of Cairo, Egypt.

== History ==
The mosque is part of a funerary complex commissioned by Aslam al-Baha'i, a Mamluk amir (commander or high official) of Kipchak origin during the period of Sultan al-Nasir Muhammad. He started his career as a mamluk under Sultan Qalawun and rose through the ranks over time. Al-Nasir Muhammad appointed him as his armsbearer (al-silahdar) and as a high-ranking commander. Aslam was later accused of treason and imprisoned from 1323 to 1333, then reinstated towards the end of al-Nasir's reign. Under al-Nasir's successors, he rose to a position on the Council of Amirs. Aslam al-Baha'i died in 1346, during the reign of al-Muzaffar Hajji.

Aslam's funerary complex is dated to the years 1344–1345 CE (745–746 AH). The building has two foundation inscriptions: one on the northwestern portal and one on its southwestern portal. The southern inscription states that construction began in Jumada I 745 AH (September–October 1344 CE) and finished in Rabi' I 746 AH (July 1345 CE), while the western inscription gives the completion date as Rajab 746 AH (October–November 1345). The four-month difference between the two completion dates could mean that the later date refers to the completion of an annex structure or to the completion of the building's decoration.

The complex was built on land that was previously part of a cemetery during the Fatimid and Ayyubid periods. It stands close to Bab al-Mahruq, a gate in the eastern wall of the city built in the Ayyubid period. The layout and orientation of the complex suggest that it was likely built next to a public square (maydan), still partly present today. Aslam's mausoleum, which occupies one corner of the complex today, was probably built first and was likely accompanied by a funerary garden or enclosure (hawsh). The current mosque was then likely built after this, expanding it into the current building. Several other nearby structures that were originally part of the complex have not survived today, including a rab' (apartment complex), a hod (water trough for animals), a sabil, and an istabl (residence with stables). The mosque was given the status of a Friday mosque, although it does not have the hypostyle and courtyard layout normally associated with Friday mosques of the time.

The building's condition declined over time. It went through an important restoration in 1900 by the Comité. By 2000, it was in need of another restoration. Between 2006 and 2009, the building went through a successful restoration led by the American Research Center in Egypt (ARCE) in partnership with the Aga Khan Trust for Culture (AKTC).

== Architecture ==
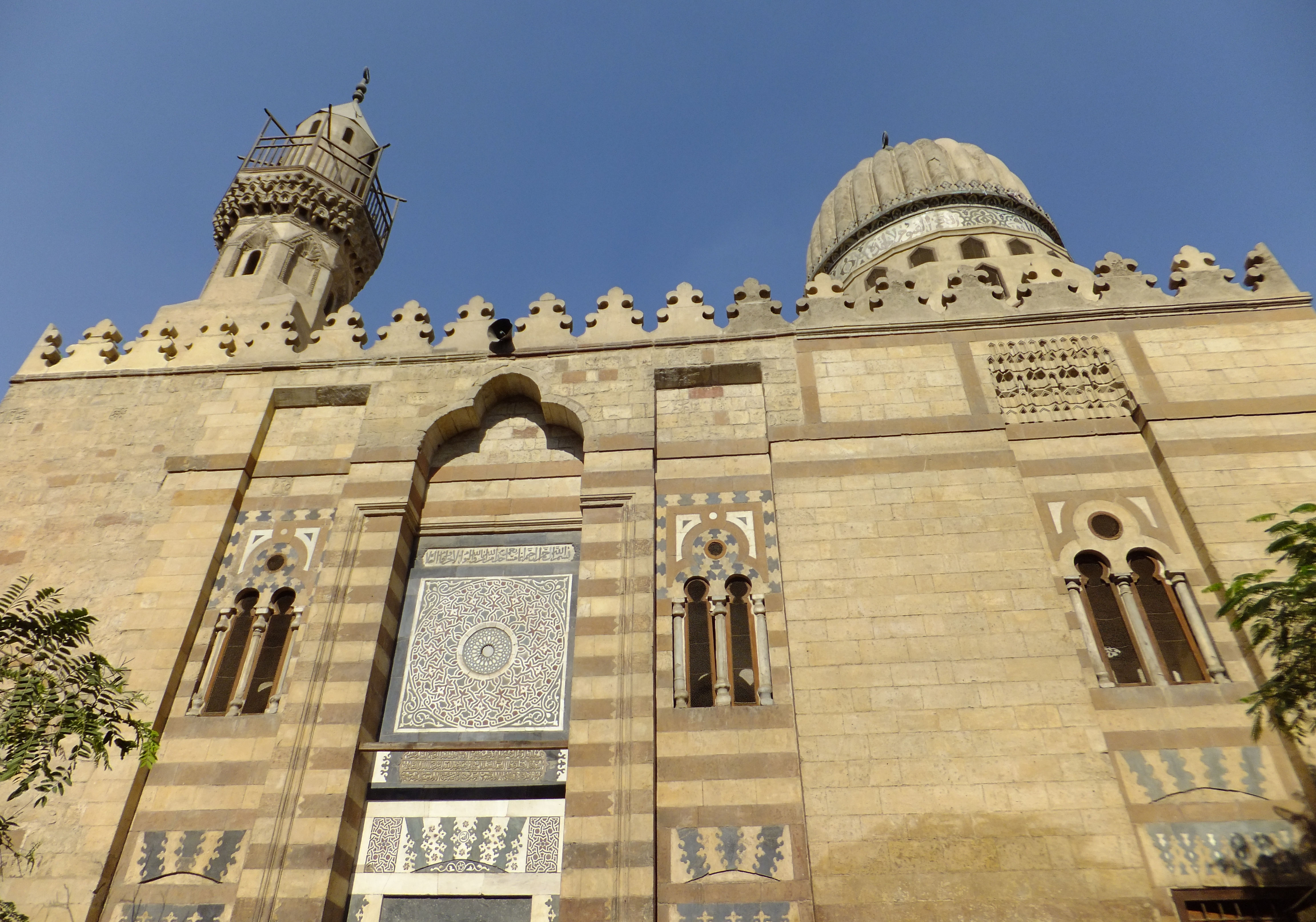
The southwestern façade of the mosque

The mosque has a slightly irregular layout probably due to the pre-existing urban fabric around the site at the time. Its external façades are aligned with the streets, while the internal layout is a cruciform or four-iwan plan. The space constraints probably also explain why the main entrance leads straight into the iwans of the mosque, which is unusual in Mamluk architecture.

=== Exterior ===
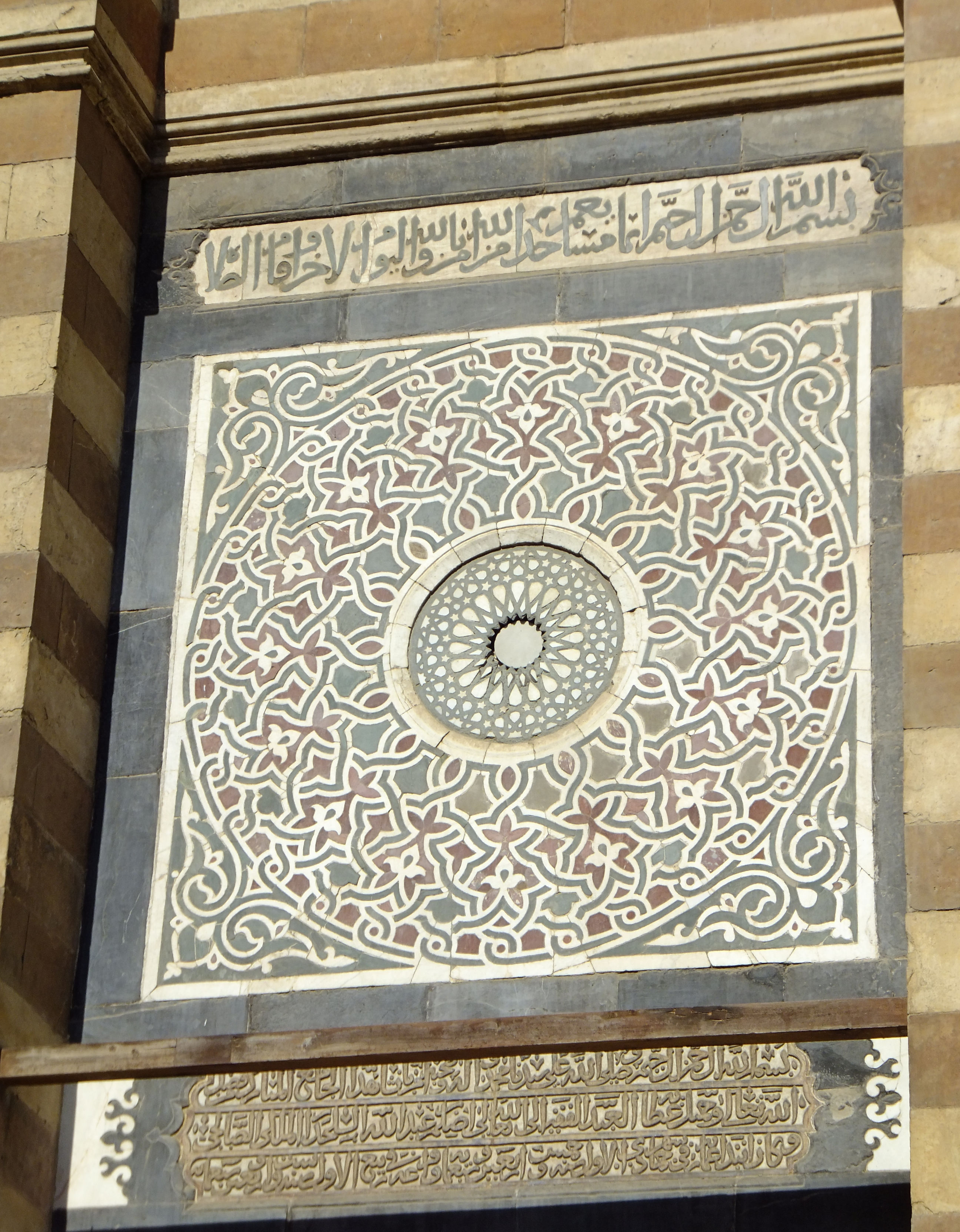
The polychrome marble arabesque medallion over the main entrance

On the outside, the building has two main facades: one on the southwest side (the main entrance) and one on the northwest side. Each faces a small public square and each features an entrance portal. Above the doorway of the southwest portal is an exceptional example of Mamluk decorative design: a rectangular marble panel occupied by a large circular medallion with a floral arabesque motif in red, black, and white. An inscription panel is below this, with letters embellished by floral finishes, and another inscription line follows above the medallion. The northwest portal has its own inscription panel. This inscription also features a highly refined design in marble: the letters are in a cursive naskh script and are accompanied by a scrolling floral motif in the background. The tops of the letters, instead of being flat, are carved into shapes matching the scrolling motif of the background.

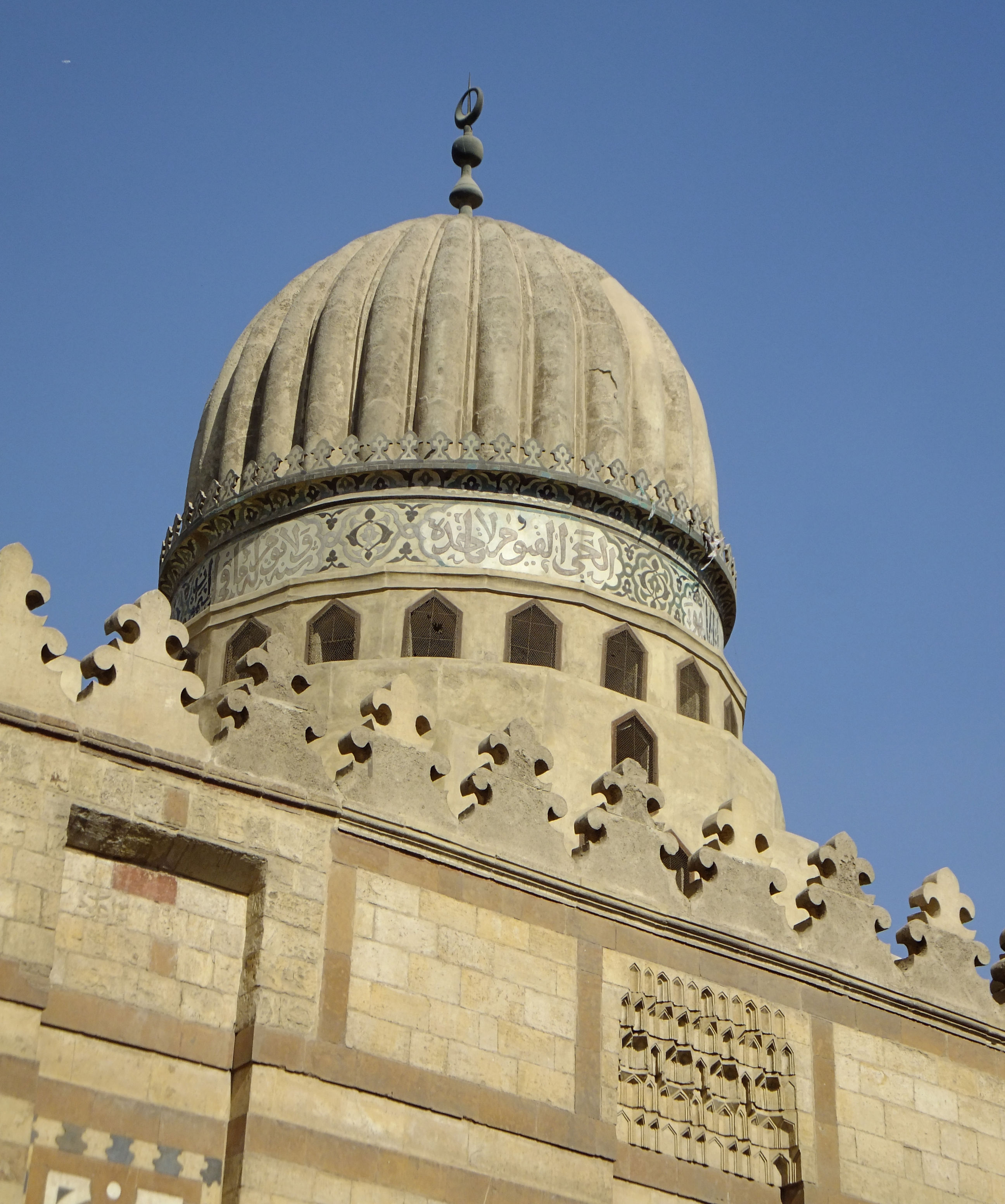
The dome of the mausoleum

Above the roofline, the minaret and the dome of the mausoleum overlook the southwest façade. The dome is made of brick and covered by an external layer of stucco that gives it a ribbed shape. Around the drum of the dome runs a band of glazed tile mosaic in white, blue, green, and black colours. The tiles form an inscription that runs around the drum, featuring the Throne Verse of the Qur'an (2:255). The tile inscription band is a feature also found on the dome of the mausoleum of Tughay, al-Nasir Muhammad's wife, constructed in the Northern Cemetery around the same period. The present-day minaret of the mosque is not from the original construction and is a much later reconstruction.

=== Interior ===
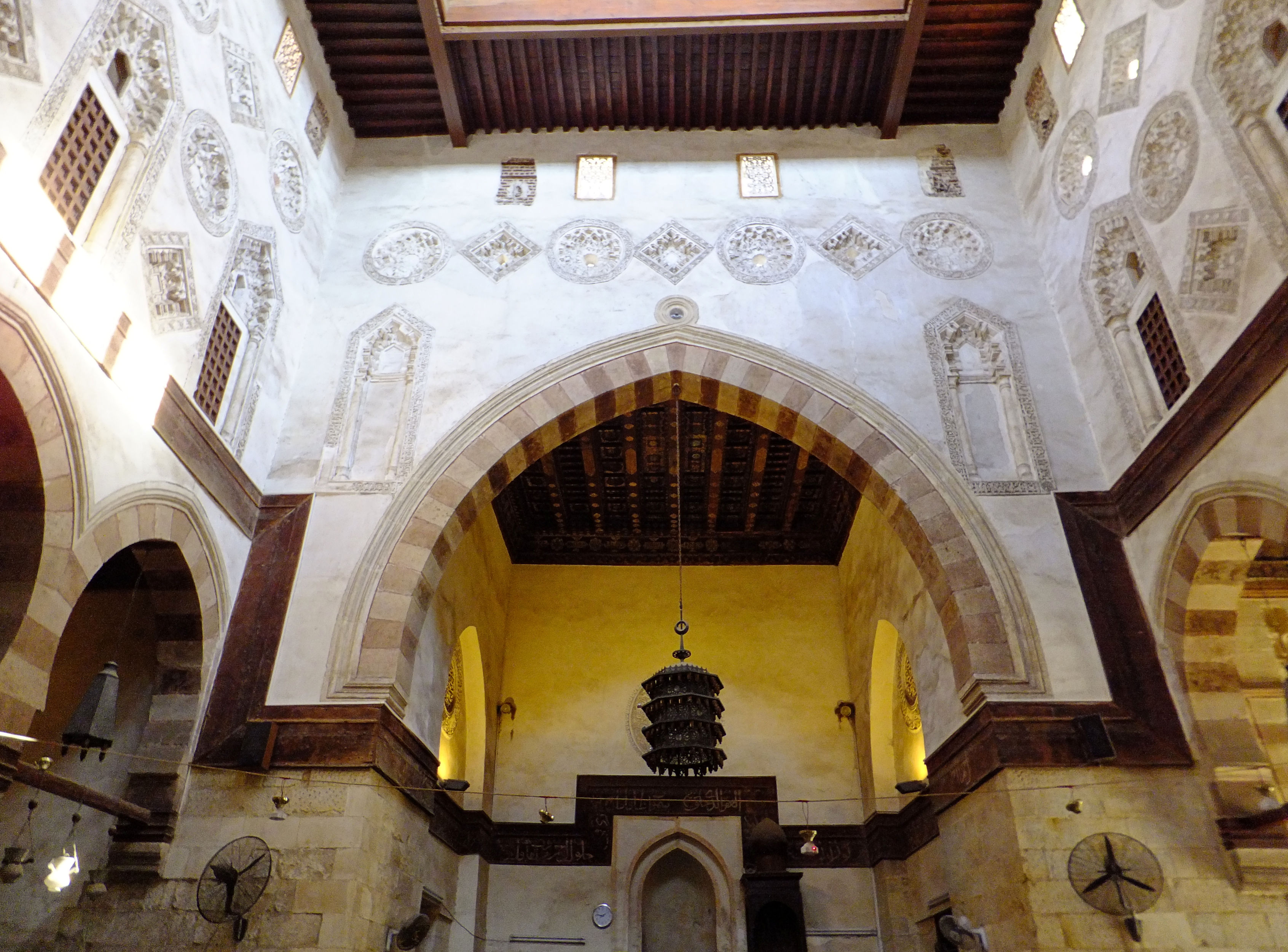
Interior of the mosque, looking towards the eastern iwan from the central courtyard

Inside, the mosque has a cruciform (four-iwan) layout with a courtyard in the middle. The east and west iwans open through a single large arch, while the lateral (north and south) iwans are separated from the courtyard by an arcade of three arches and two columns. Each of the four iwans is covered by a flat wooden ceiling. There is no evidence that a ceiling originally existed over the central courtyard; the current wooden ceiling here was added during the 1900 restoration to better protect the mosque's interior. The ceilings of the lateral (north and south) iwans are lower than those of the main (east and west) iwans. The windows in the courtyard walls above them signal the presence of upstairs rooms that were probably used by the inhabitants of the complex, perhaps for lessons. The wall above the western iwan is partly taken by a large balcony, also accessible from upstairs. This was probably used as a dikka by muezzins. Another balcony that crosses the arch of the iwan itself was probably just used as a bridge or passage.

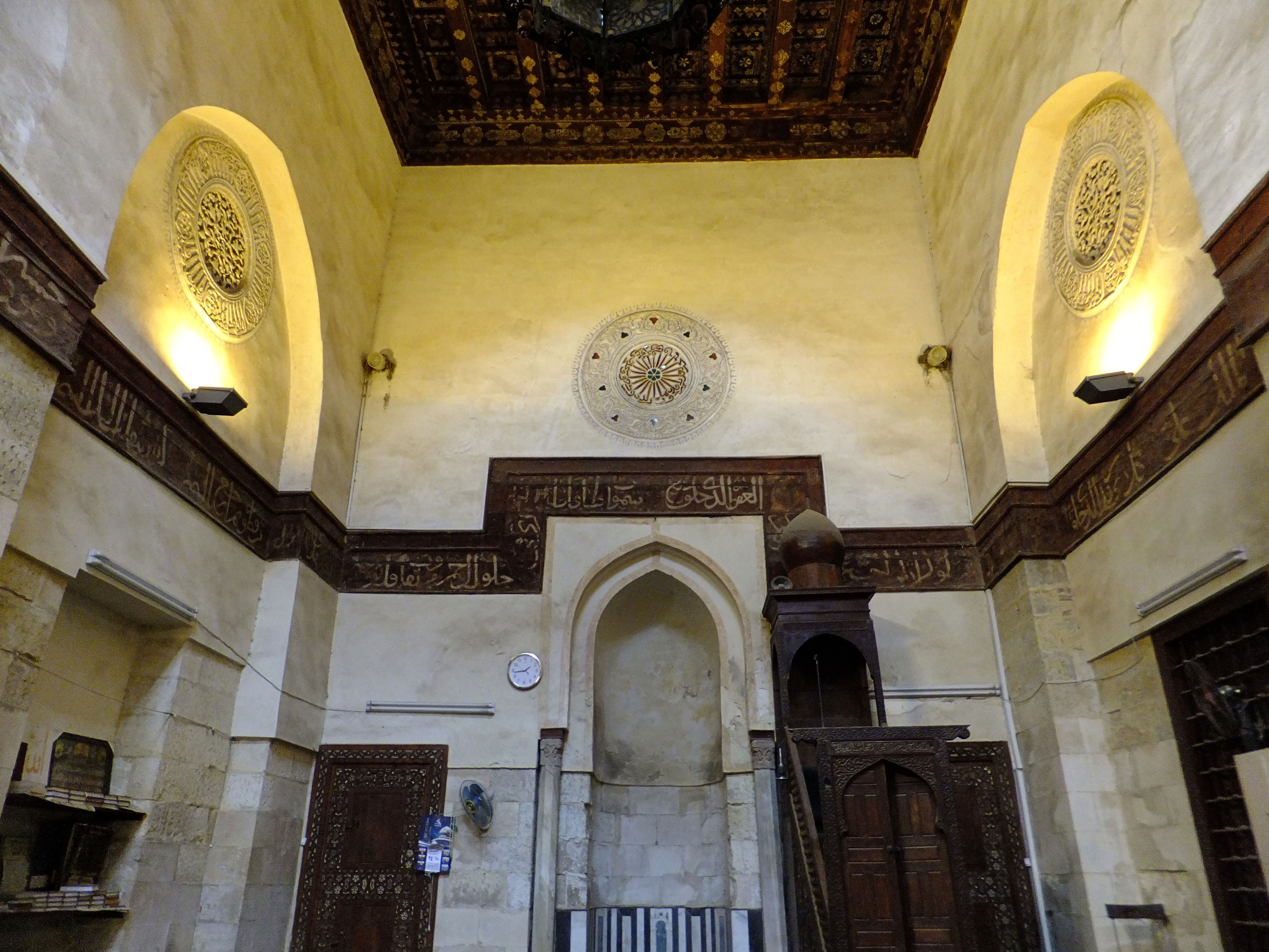
The eastern (qibla) iwan, with the mihrab and decorative stucco medallions

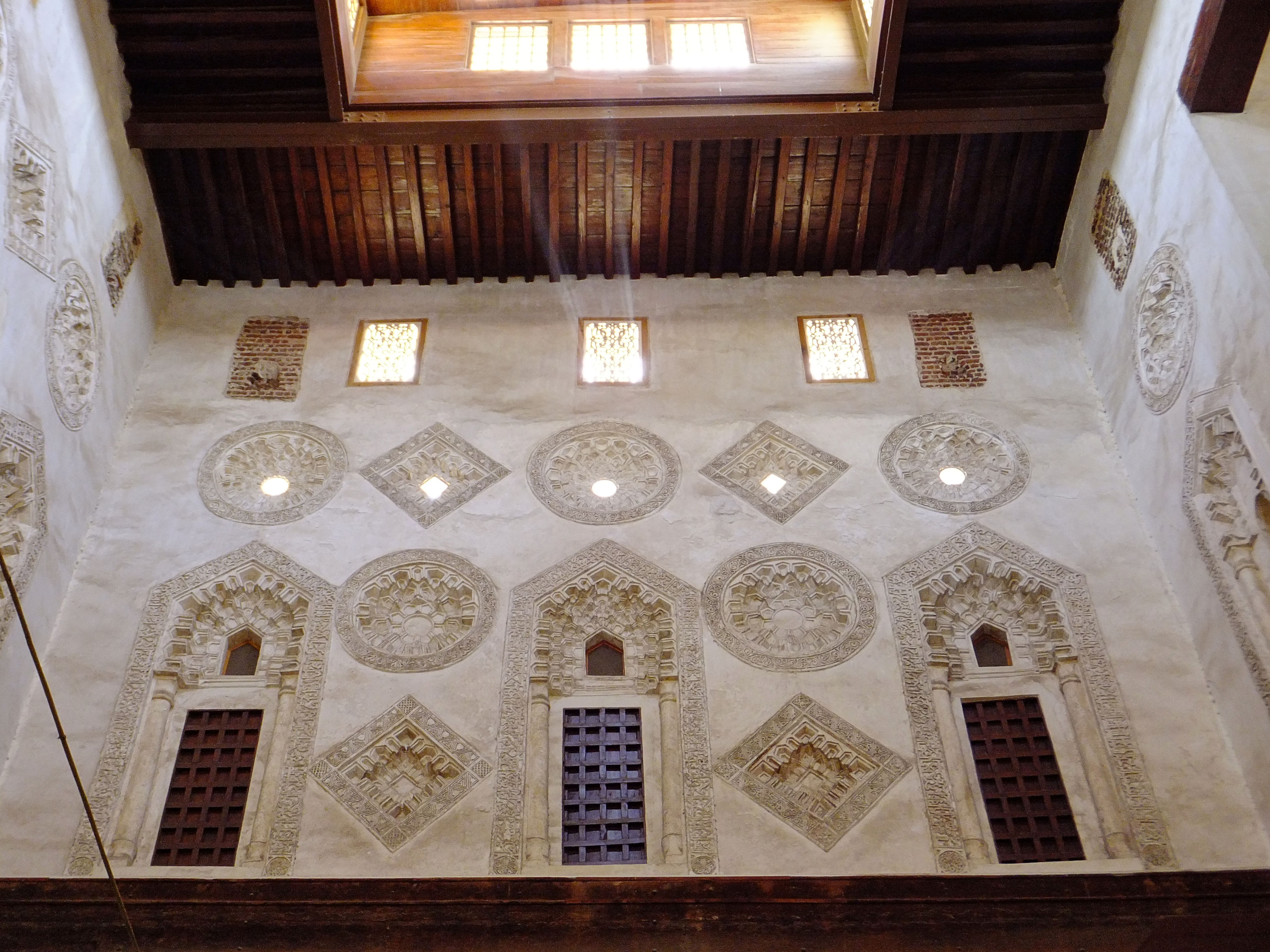
Carved stucco decoration on the upper walls of the courtyard

The most notable feature of the mosque interior is its stucco decoration, which is generally concentrated along the upper walls of the courtyard and of the eastern (qibla) iwan. Aside from the western wall (which is occupied by the balcony), the upper walls of the courtyard are decorated with a series of medallions, lozenges, and blind keel arches all carved in stucco. Inside the east iwan, which is aligned with the qibla (direction of prayer), the mihrab (niche symbolizing the qibla) is plain, but above it is a stucco-carved medallion with a circular Arabic inscription where the letters are inset with red and blue glass. Each of the side walls of this iwan has a shallow recess inside which is another stucco-carved medallion inlaid with ceramic.

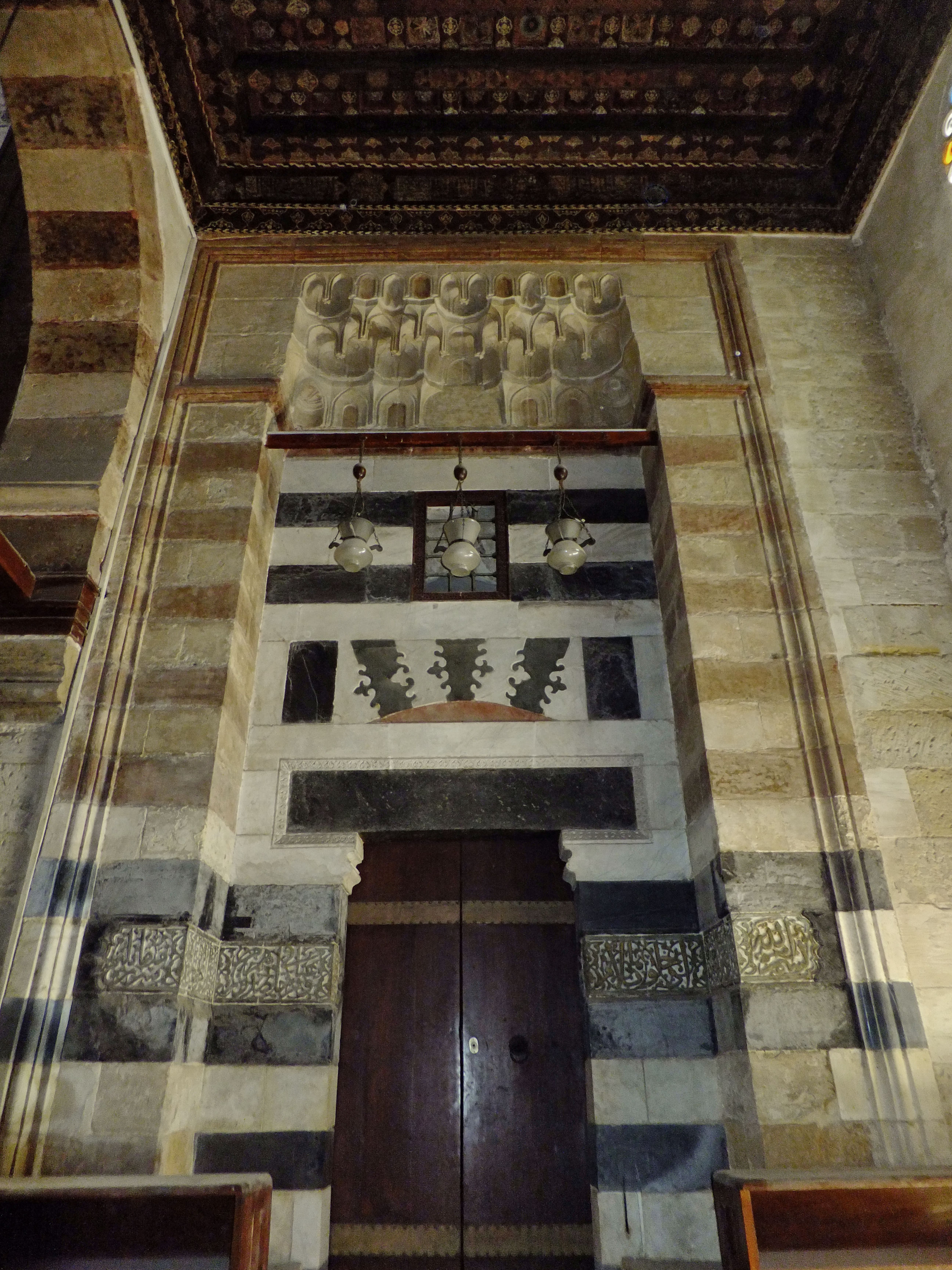
The entrance portal to the mausoleum

The mausoleum chamber occupies the southeastern corner of the building and is entered via a stone portal in the southern iwan. The portal is decorated with ablaq (multi-coloured) masonry. Inside, the mausoleum is decorated with high-quality stucco carvings, although some of it appears to be missing. The mihrab here is finely decorated with carved arabesques and calligraphic bands, a relatively late example of a stucco-carved mihrab in Mamluk architecture. Above it is a stucco medallion with a grille carved from another calligraphic inscription and arabesques around it. The upper walls have stained glass windows. The transition from the square chamber to the round dome is accomplished through muqarnas-carved squinches.
