= Amir Alin Aq Palace =

- قصر الأمير آلين أق
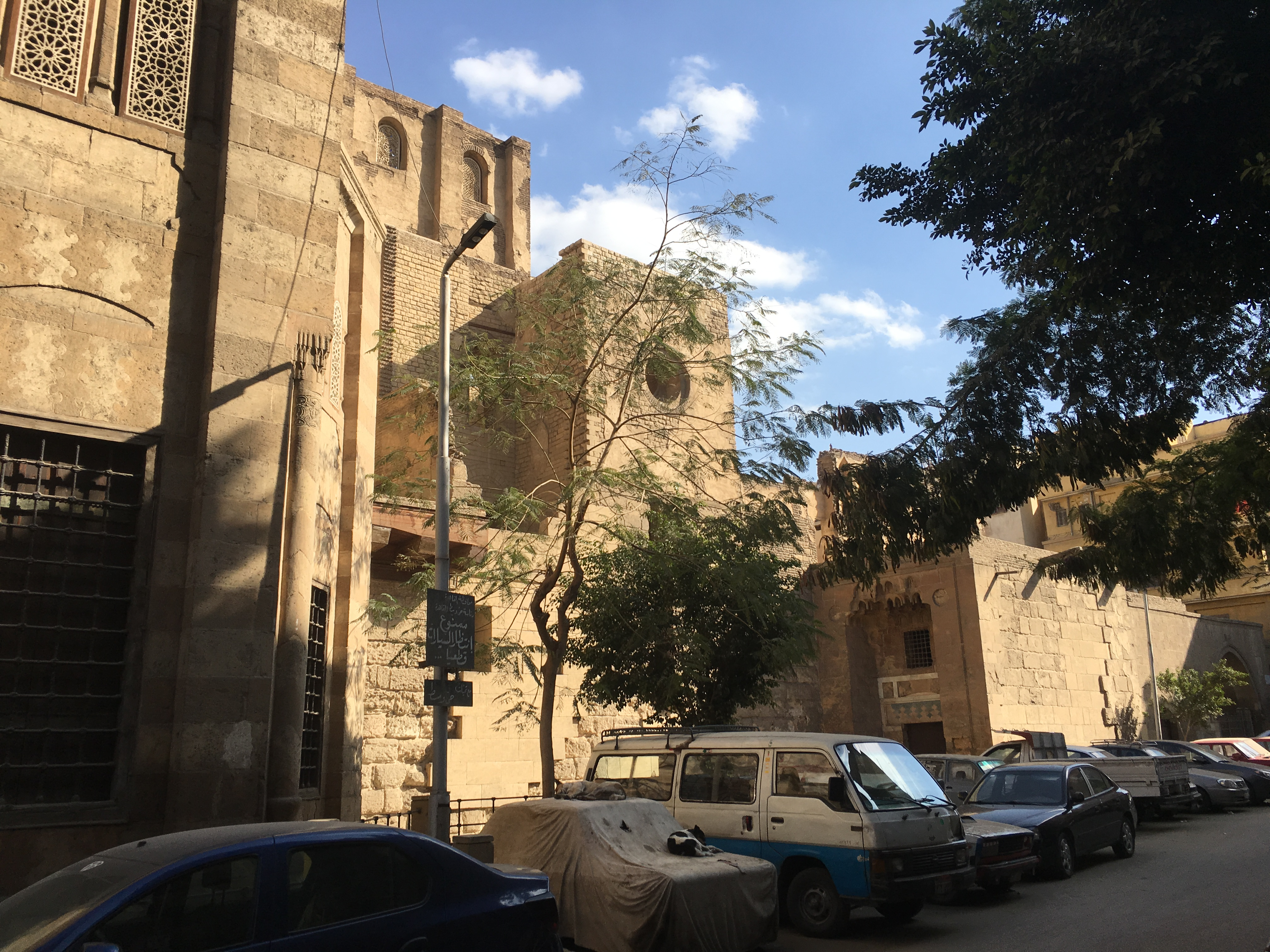
- Amir Alin Aq Palace, exterior view, January 2020
- Interactive map of the Amir Alin Aq Palace area
- Alternative names: Amir Khayrbak Palace, Emir Khayrbak Palace, Amir Khayr Bak Palace

General information
- Type: Palace
- Architectural style: Egyptian Mamluk architecture
- Location: Al-Darb al-Ahmar; Cairo, Egypt
- Coordinates: 30°02′08″N 31°15′37″E
- Completed: 1293

Amir Alin Aq Palace (Egyptian Arabic: قصر الأمير آلين أق) (also known as Amir Khayrbak Palace, Emir Khayrbak Palace, or Amir Khayr Bek Palace) was built in 1293. It stands on the Darb al-Ahmar, the ceremonial road leading to the Citadel in Cairo, Egypt. Its reception hall (qa'a) is particularly notable.

Alin Aq was an amir and cupbearer to Sultan al-Ashraf Khalil ibn Qalawun. This building is early Bahri and is now in ruins, with the exception of the portal. In the 16th century it was the residence of the Amir Khayrbak, whose mosque is adjacent.

Khayrbak was the first Ottoman governor of Egypt. It is said he was cruel and greedy.

== See also ==
- Amir Khayrbak Funerary Complex
