= Al-Darb al-Ahmar =

District of Cairo, Egypt

Coordinates: 30.0414°N 31.2584°E

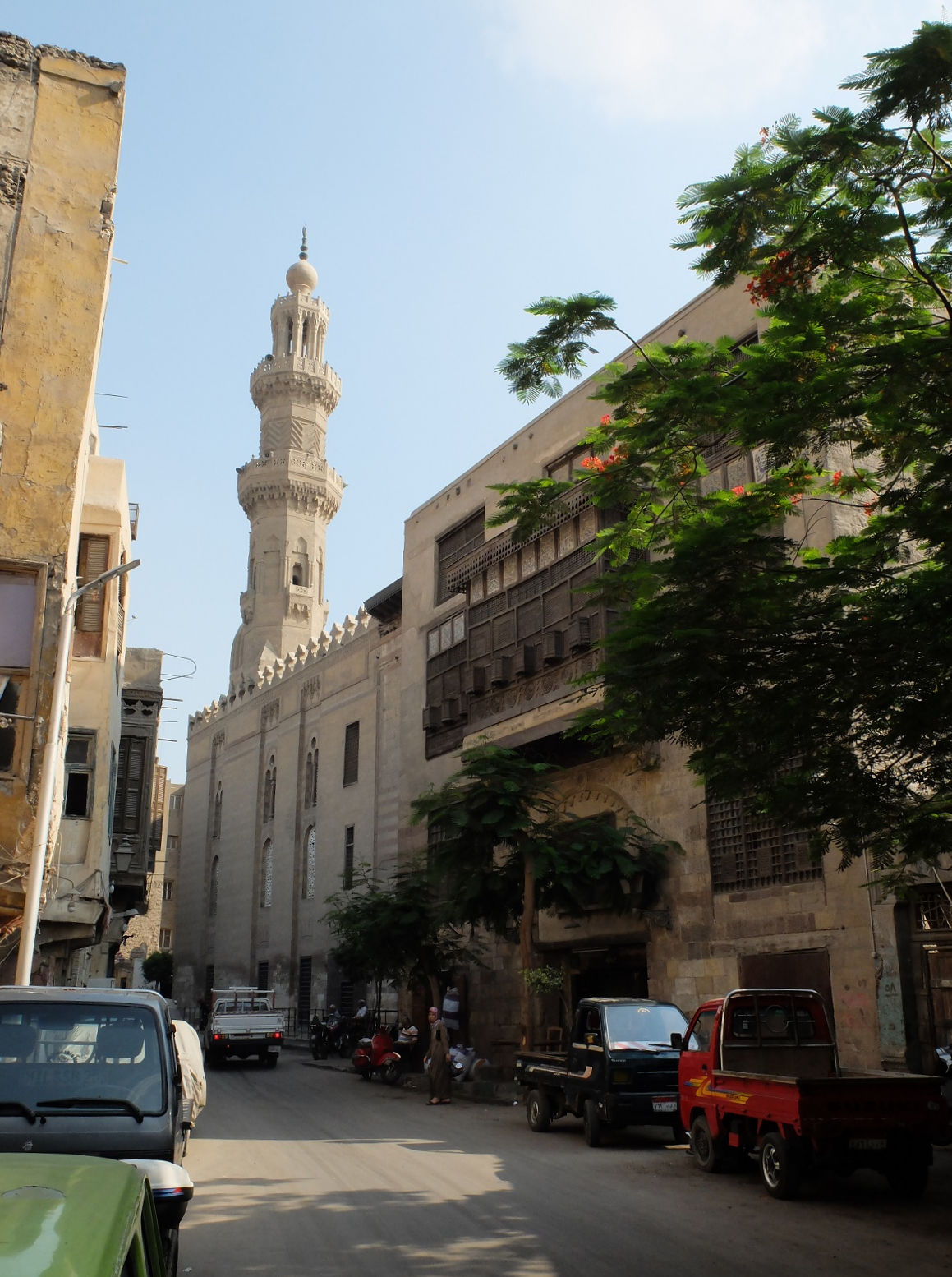
Darb al-Ahmar street, in front of Bayt al-Razzaz palace and the Madrasa of Umm Sha'ban.

Al-Darb al-Ahmar (Arabic: الدرب الأحمر, lit. 'the red way/street') is a historic neighbourhood in Cairo, Egypt. It is part of the UNESCO World Heritage Site of Historic Cairo. Located south of the old walled city of Cairo, originally built by the Fatimids in the 10th century, it began to urbanize largely during the 14th century in the Mamluk period.

Today, al-Darb al-Ahmar is an administrative division (qism) within the district of Wasat al-Qahira (Central Cairo). This division includes the area south of al-Azhar street, encompassing the southern half of the original Fatimid Cairo and what is now al-Azhar University, as well as the nearby Al-Azhar Park.

== History ==
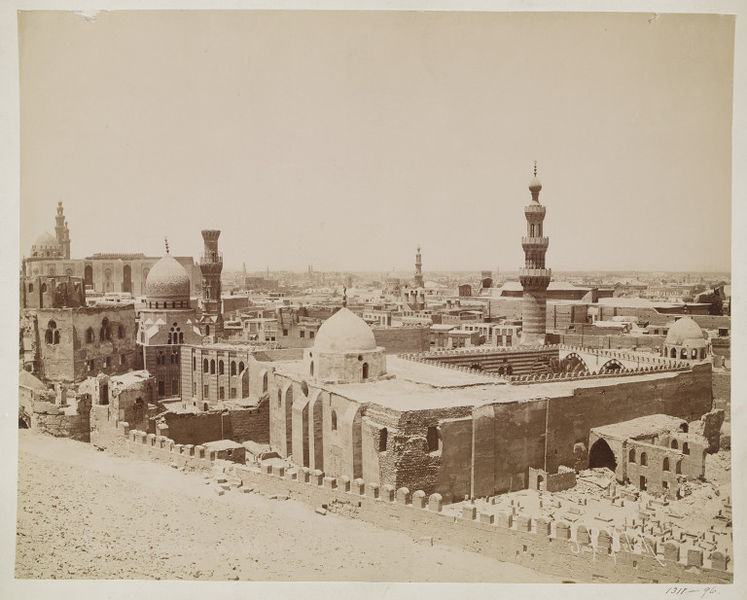
A late 19th or early 20th century view over Darb al-Ahmar (specifically near Bab al-Wazir street). On the right is the 14th-century Mosque of Aqsunqur, on the left is the early 16th-century Mosque-Mausoleum of Khayrbek.

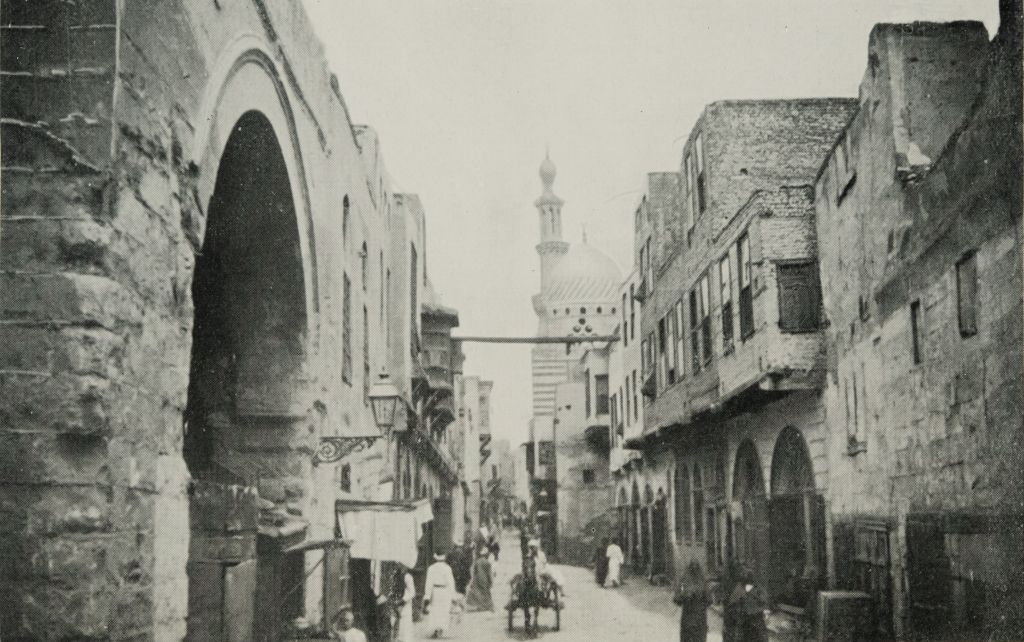
View of Souq al-Silah street (a former armorers' market), on the edge of the Darb al-Ahmar district. The dome and minaret belong to the 14th-century Madrasa of Uljay al-Yusufi.

The area south of Cairo's city walls, between Bab Zuweila and the Citadel, was initially the site of Fatimid and Ayyubid-era cemeteries. Under the prosperous reign of Sultan al-Nasir Muhammad (between 1293 and 1341) the population of the city reached its peak and the area began to be developed in earnest. The city expanded southwards and many Mamluk elites were eager to build new establishments closer to the Citadel, the seat of the sultan's power. Al-Nasir himself encouraged this development and even built some of the palaces northwest of the Citadel for his amirs (e.g. the Palace of Amir Qawsun), just as he was building his own palaces inside the Citadel. The Bab al-Wazir Cemetery also developed next to the neighbourhood at this time, just outside the old Ayyubid city walls.

As a result of this period's development, most of the neighbourhood's notable historic monuments date from the 14th century. From the late 14th century onward, however, Cairo suffered from the Black Plague and its population declined and did not recover until centuries later. Nonetheless, the area did develop further during the Ottoman period. The Qasaba of Radwan Bey (now part of the Tentmakers' Street), for example, was a commercial urban complex developed in the 17th century along the old Qasaba road (now al-Mu'izz Street) and partly aimed at promoting urbanization of the area. The area received further urbanization impetus during the 19th century when Muhammad 'Ali Pasha again redeveloped the nearby Citadel as a seat of power. He granted various plots of land in al-Darb al-Ahmar to important army officers who were thus encouraged to build in the area.

In 1979, al-Darb al-Ahmar was listed by UNESCO as part of the World Heritage Site of Historic Cairo. The district was a center of craftsmanship for generations, but in recent years it has suffered from the liberalization of Egypt's economy and the neighbourhood is hampered by poverty. The district also suffered heavy damage during the 1992 Cairo earthquake.

The weakness of central authority has recently created problems for historic conservation, as many old houses are being demolished and replaced with modern high-rise structures.

== Geography and description ==
The neighbourhood historically consists of the area between the Citadel and Bab Zuweila. However, the modern administrative ward (qism) of al-Darb al-Ahmar has different borders: it is bordered to the north by al-Azhar street, to the east by Salah Salem Road, to the south by the Khalifa district and the Cairo Citadel, and to the west by Port Said Street (or al-Khalig).

The neighbourhood is centered around two or three main streets, one of which is named al-Darb al-Ahmar, giving the district its name. The southern sections of al-Darb al-Ahmar Street officially have different names, however, such as Bab al-Wazir Street (named after a former city gate). Another major street, which branches off al-Darb al-Ahmar street, is Souq al-Silah Street, which was once a market for producers of arms and armor near the Citadel. The modern Muhammad 'Ali Street (Shari'a Muhammad 'Ali) also cuts across the southwestern side of the district.

== Demographics ==
In the 2017 census, the neighbourhood had about 58,489 residents, living in 14 shiakhas (census blocks):

Shiakha	Code 2017	Population
`Imarî, al-	011405	6652
Bâb al-Wazîr & al-Gharîb	011409	3052
Bâṭniyya, al-	011401	4551
Darb al-Aḥmar, al-	011403	2757
Darb Sa`âda	011412	3111
Darb Shughlân	011413	4145
Dâwûdiyya, al-	011402	5837
Ghûriyya, al-	011406	2994
Mugharbilîn, al-	011408	5419
Qirabiyya, al-	011407	2958
Surûjiyya, al-	011404	6642
Sûq al-Silâḥ	011414	5111
Taḥt al-Rab`	011410	2290
Ḥârat al-Rûm	011411	2970

According to a 2010 report on the neighbourhood, the district includes some of the poorest households in Egypt, with unemployment as high as 60% (mostly among women) and a 45% rate of illiteracy. About 83% of the population was born locally.

== Present-day conservation efforts ==
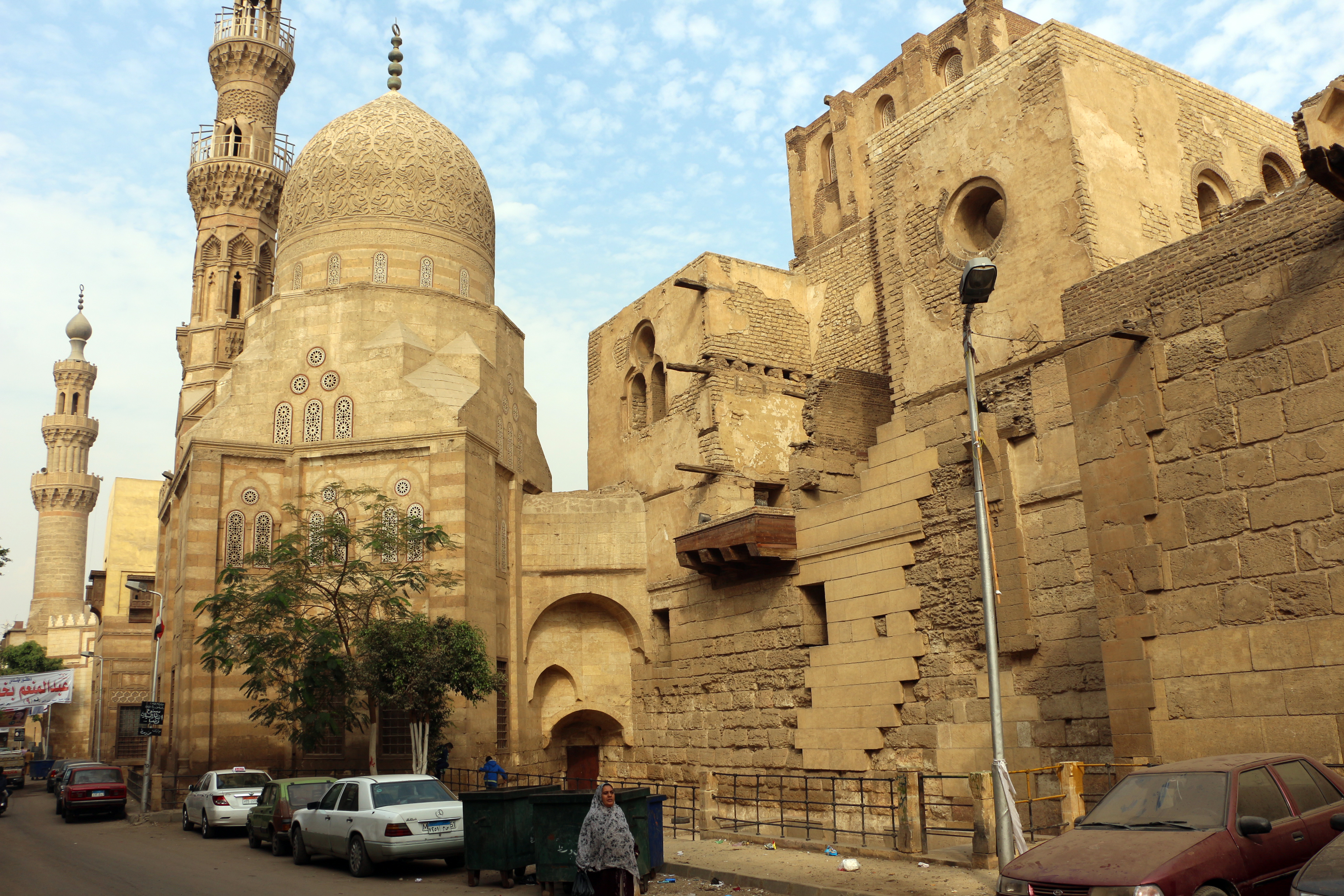
Bab al-Wazir street today, in front of the restored Mausoleum-Mosque of Amir Khayrbak and the remains of the Palace of Alin Aq.

Since around 2000, the area has been the subject of a long-running conservation and restoration program led by the Aga Khan Trust for Culture, aimed at restoring and rehabilitating historic monuments within the urban fabric of the neighbourhood. Monuments that were restored include the Mausoleum complex of Khayrbek and surrounding structures, the Madrasa of Umm al-Sultan Sha'ban, the Mosque of Aslam al-Silahdar, and the Mausoleum of Tarabay al-Sharifi. The development program also involved the creation of al-Azhar Park, one of the few major green spaces in Cairo, which adjoins the neighbourhood today to the east.

== Historic monuments in the neighbourhood ==
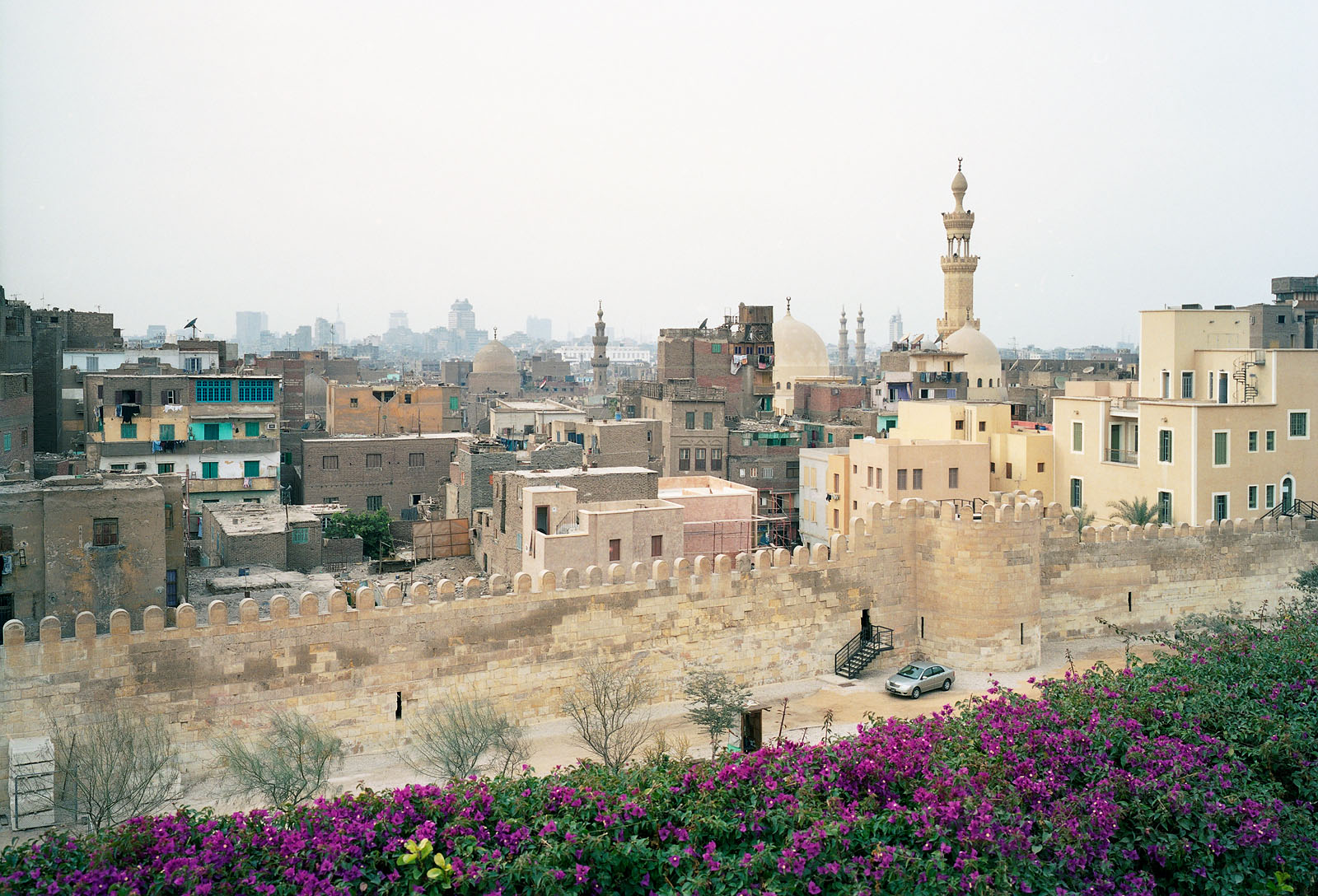
View of al-Darb al-Ahmar neighbourhood and the Ayyubid city walls from al-Azhar Park.

Below is a list of some of the notable historic monuments in al-Darb al-Ahmar:

- Qasaba (covered market) of Radwan Bey
- Mosque of al-Salih Tala'i
- Mosque of Qijmas al-Ishaqi
- Mosque of Aslam al-Silahdar
- Mosque of al-Maridani
- Mosque and Mausoleum of Amir Ahmad al-Mihmandar
- Madrasa of Umm Sultan al-Sha'ban
- Bayt al-Razzaz palace
- Mosque of Aqsunqur (Blue Mosque)
- Mausoleum complex of Khayrbek
- Mausoleum of Tarabay al-Sharifi
- Madrasa of Uljay al-Yusufi
- Ayyubid City walls (excavated and restored as part of the development of al-Azhar Park)
- Maristan of al-Mu'ayyad
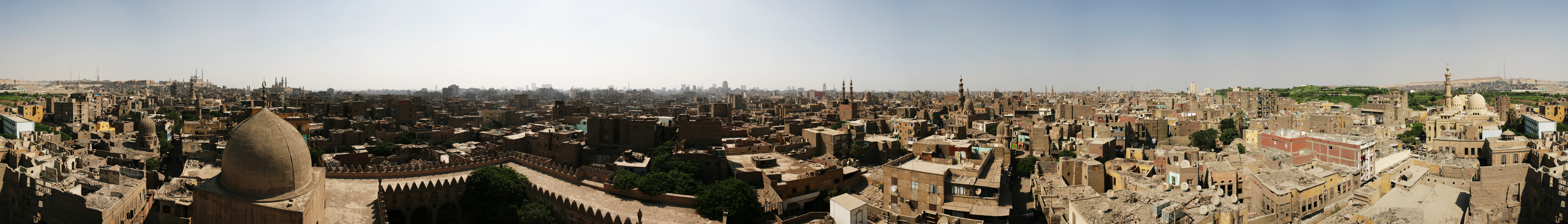
A view of al-Darb al-Ahmar, from the minaret of the Mosque of Amir al-Maridani.
