= Bab al-Wazir =

Demolished gate of Cairo's city walls

Coordinates: 30.036306°N 31.259967°E

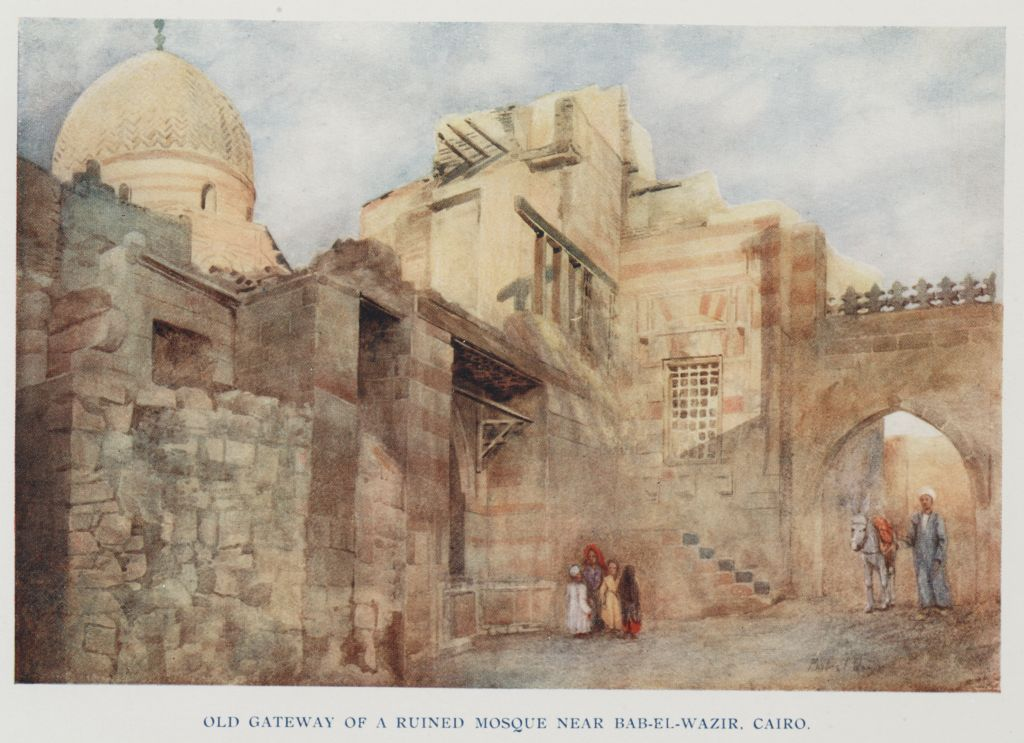
Bab al-Wazir in 1907

Bab al-Wazir - the Minister's Gate - was one of the gates in the walls of the Old City of Cairo. It was finished in 1341 by a vizier of Sultan An-Nasir Muhammad and demolished in 2013.

It was part of the Ayyubid-wall in the Darb al-Ahmar district of historic Cairo next to Aqsunqur Mosque and gave Bab el-Wazir street its name. Also located in the vicinity is the Bab al-Wazir Cemetery, which contains a number of Mamluk mausoleums and structures, including the restored Mausoleum of Tarabay al-Sharifi. There are plans to restore the gate.

== See also ==
- Bab al-Nasr
- Bab Zuweila
- Bab al-Futuh
- Gates of Cairo
