= Amir Khayrbak Funerary Complex =

Mosque in Cairo, Egypt

- مسجد ومدرسة الأمير خاير بك
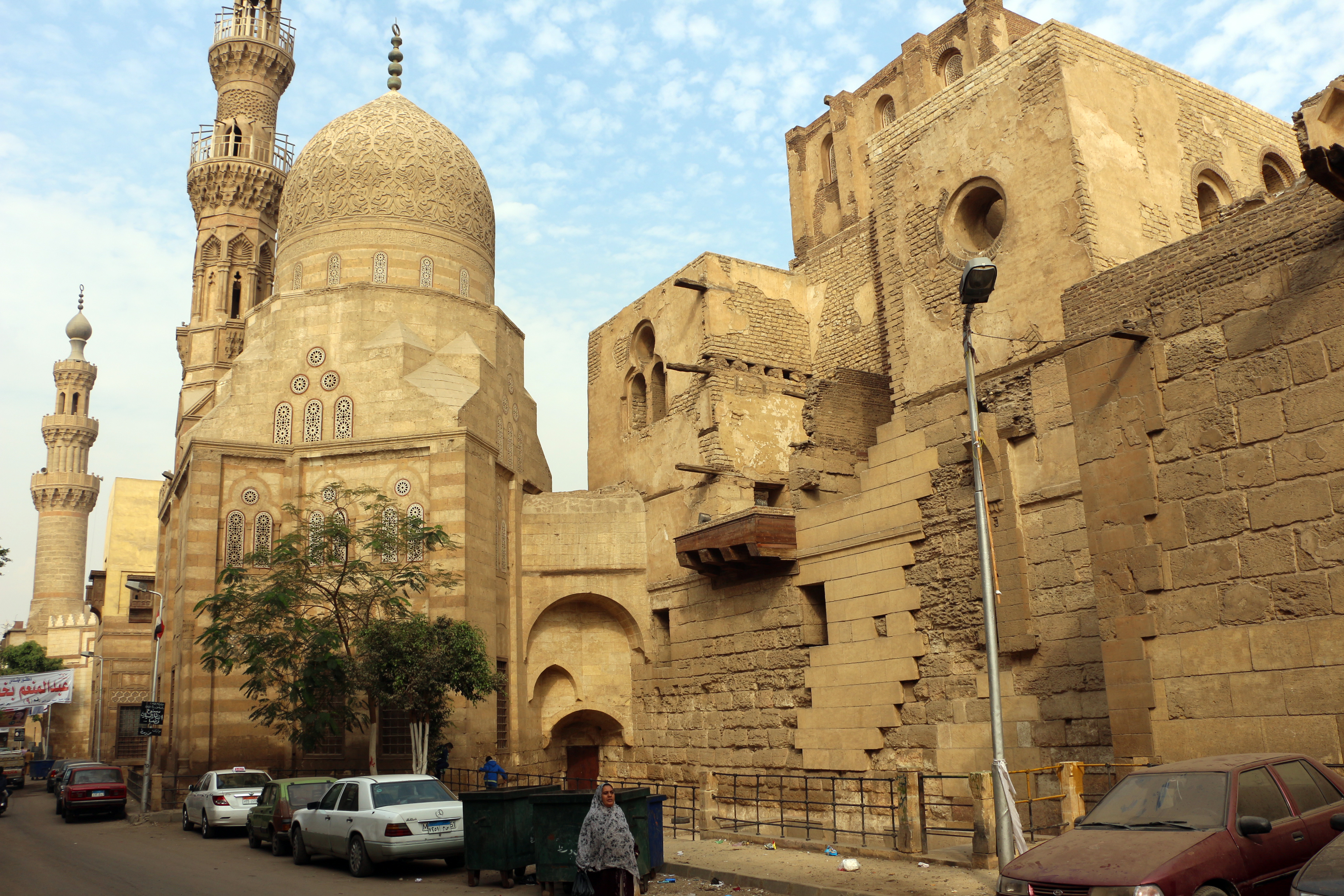

Religion
- Affiliation: Islam
- Ecclesiastical or organisational status: Madrasa; Mausoleum; Mosque
- Status: Active

Location
- Location: Bab al-Wazir street, Darb al-Ahmar, Islamic Cairo
- Country: Egypt
- Interactive map of Amir Khayrbak Funerary Complex
- Coordinates: 30°02′08″N 31°15′37″E

Architecture
- Type: Islamic funerary structure
- Style: Islamic; Mamluk
- Completed: 1502 CE (mausoleum); 1520 CE (madrasa/mosque)

Specifications
- Dome: 1
- Minaret: 1

The Amir Khayrbak Funerary Complex (Arabic: مسجد ومدرسة الأمير خاير بك), also known as the Mosque-Madrasa of Al-Amir Khair Bak, and as the Khayrbak Mosque, is an Islamic religious funerary complex located at Bab al-Wazir street, in the Darb al-Ahmar district of Islamic Cairo, Egypt. The complex originally consisted of a mausoleum established by the Ottoman governor of Egypt Khayr Bak in 908 AH (1502/1503 CE). In 926 AH (1519/1520 CE), he added a madrasa and a mosque, and annexed the adjacent Amir Alin Aq Palace which was used by him as residence. In the surrounding area there is the Citadel located to the southeast, the Amir Alin Aq Palace is located to the southwest, and the Aqsunqur Mosque to the northeast. It is one of many Circassian (Burji) style Mamluk architectures built during the Middle Ages.

== Architecture ==
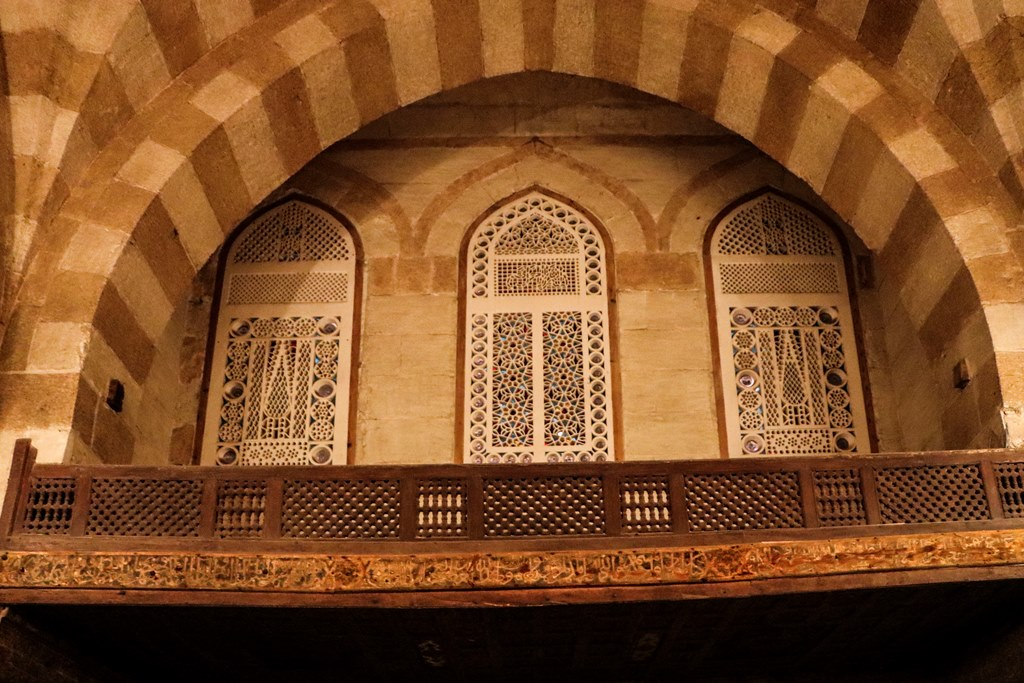
Inside the mosque

On the exterior there is a domed roof with floral motifs, an arched entrance covered with muqarnas, a pathway that leads to north end of the complex, and a minaret which lost its peak at the earthquake of 1884, but was reconstructed in 2003.

As for the interior, it is rectangular shaped and there is an incised bowl with four ribs, and it is surrounded by four iwans. The eastern and western iwans are deeper than the iwan with qibla which occupies the southern side of the building and the northern iwan on the opposite side, due to the building being rectangular. The walls of the iwans are surrounded by a 1.5-metre (4.9 ft) marble mantle above the madrasa floor, topped with a strip inscribed with verses from Surah al-Fath. The mihrab is in the middle of the southern wall and is surrounded by two smaller rings. These three girders occupy the whole area of the southern iwan.

== See also ==
- Islam in Egypt
- List of madrasas in Egypt
- List of mausoleums in Egypt
- List of mosques in Cairo
- Late medieval domes
