= Mausoleum of Tarabay al-Sharifi =

Funerary complex in Cairo, Egypt

Coordinates: 30.034555°N 31.260918°E

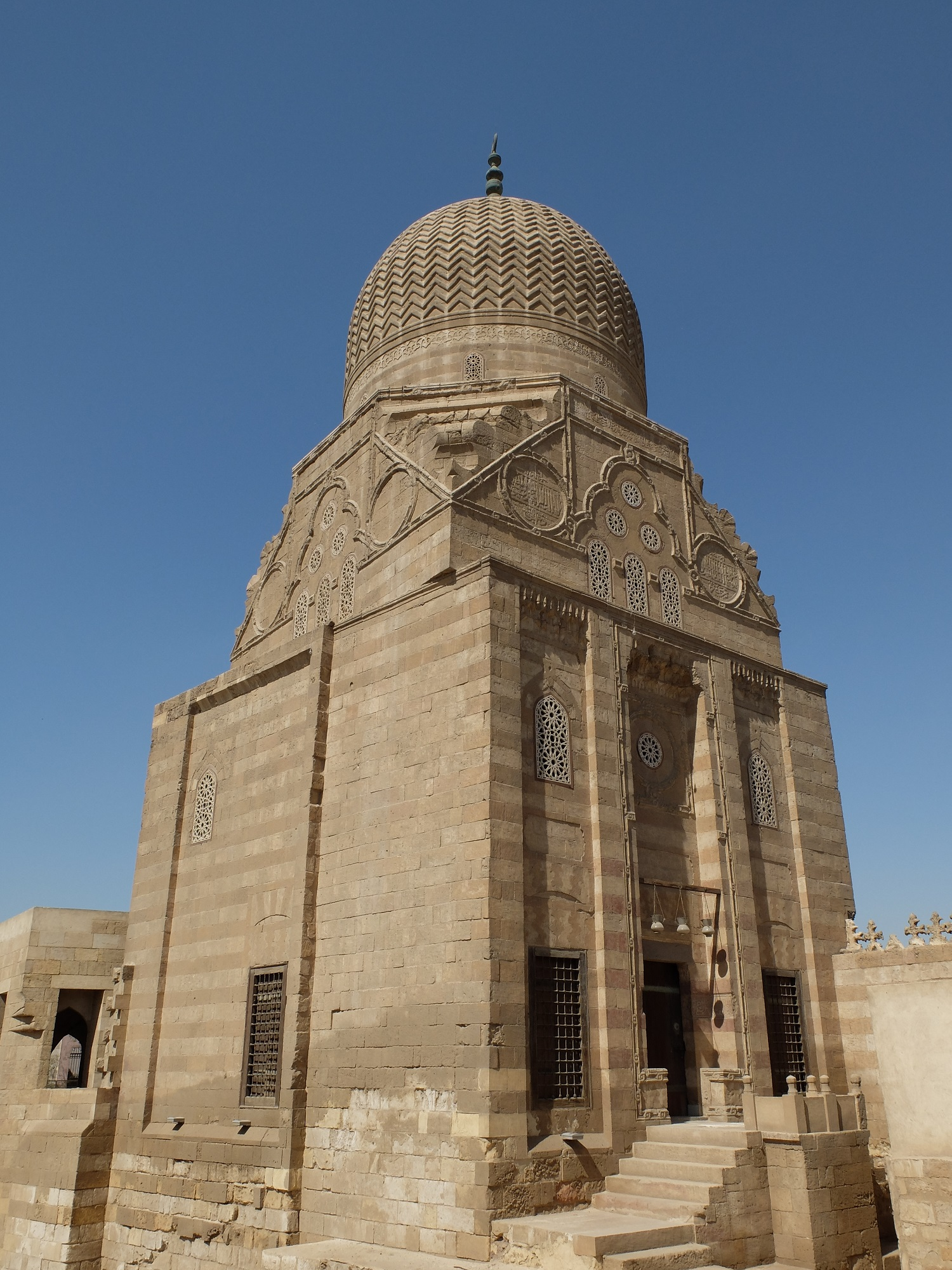

- Location within Egypt

Religion
- Affiliation: Islam
- Region: Africa
- Patron: (amir) Tarabay al-Sharifi

Location
- Location: Bab al-Wazir Cemetery, al-Darb al-Ahmar, Cairo, Egypt

Architecture
- Type: Mausoleum, sabil, kuttab
- Style: Mamluk, Islamic
- Completed: 1503-04

Specifications
- Dome: 1
- Materials: stone

The Mausoleum of Tarabay al-Sharifi is a late Mamluk funerary complex in Cairo comprising the tomb of amir Tarabay al-Sharifi as well as a sabil and kuttab (primary school), built in 1503–1504. It is located in the Bab al-Wazir Cemetery on the edge of the Darb al-Ahmar district of historic Cairo. An adjacent gate gives access from this district to the rest of the cemetery. It is considered a good example of late Mamluk architecture, combining artistic and ornamental sophistication with practical functionality in the arrangement of its different elements.

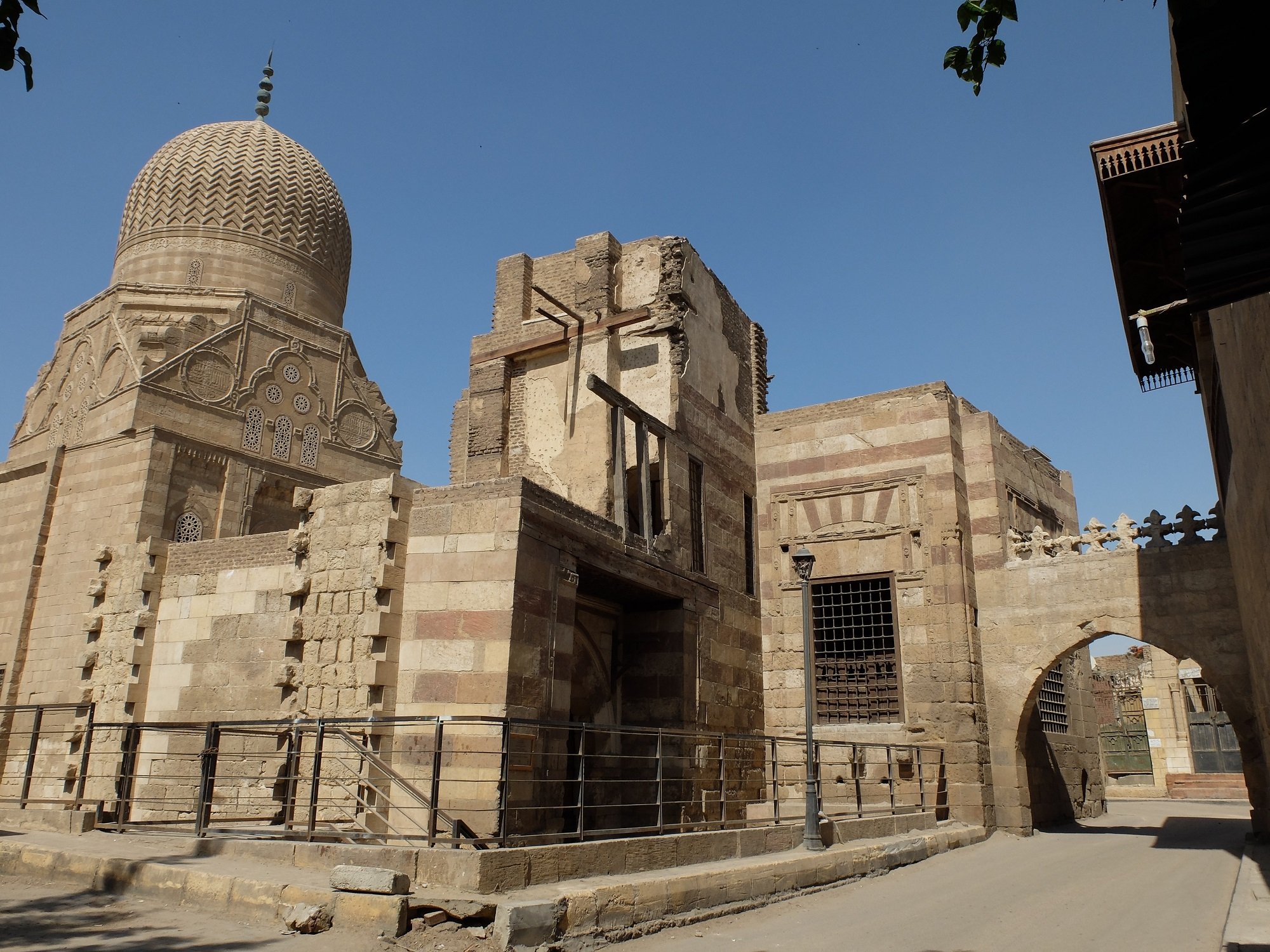
The complex of Tarabay includes the mausoleum on the left, and sabil-kuttab on the right, next to a gate.

Amir Tarabay was a mamluk slave purchased by Qaytbay who served as leader of the mamluks in Egypt under the reign of Sultan al-Ghuri (1501–1516).

Also adjacent and attached to the same site is the ribat and mausoleum of Azdumur, built in the same period. Azdumur was another mamluk purchased by Qaytbay, though it is unclear what relationship existed, if any, between him and Tarabay.

The site was restored between 2006 and 2009 by the Aga Khan Trust for Culture, which has carried out other conservation initiatives in the Darb al-Ahmar area of Cairo.
