= Muqarnas =

Islamic architectural feature

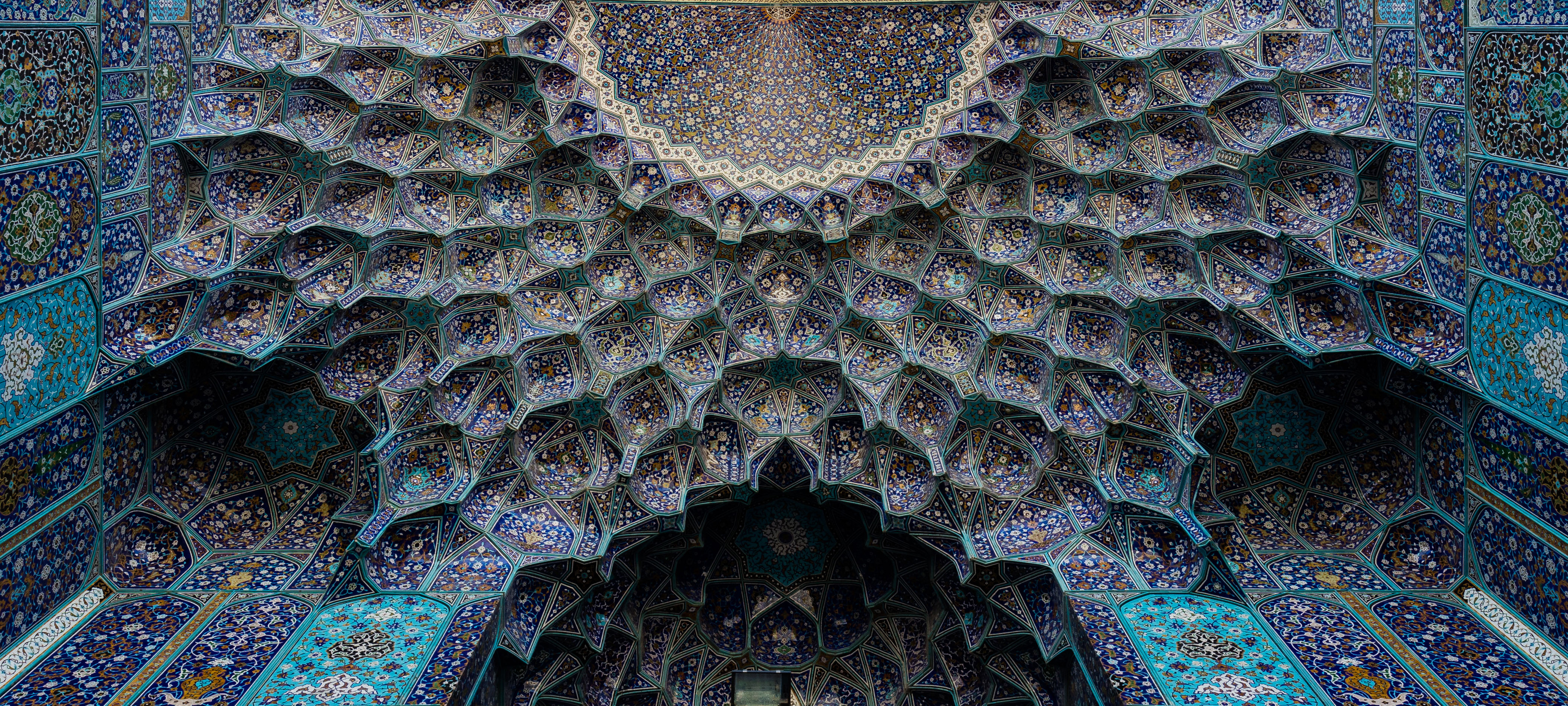
Muqarnas as seen from below in the iwan entrance to the Shah Mosque in Isfahan, Iran (17th century)

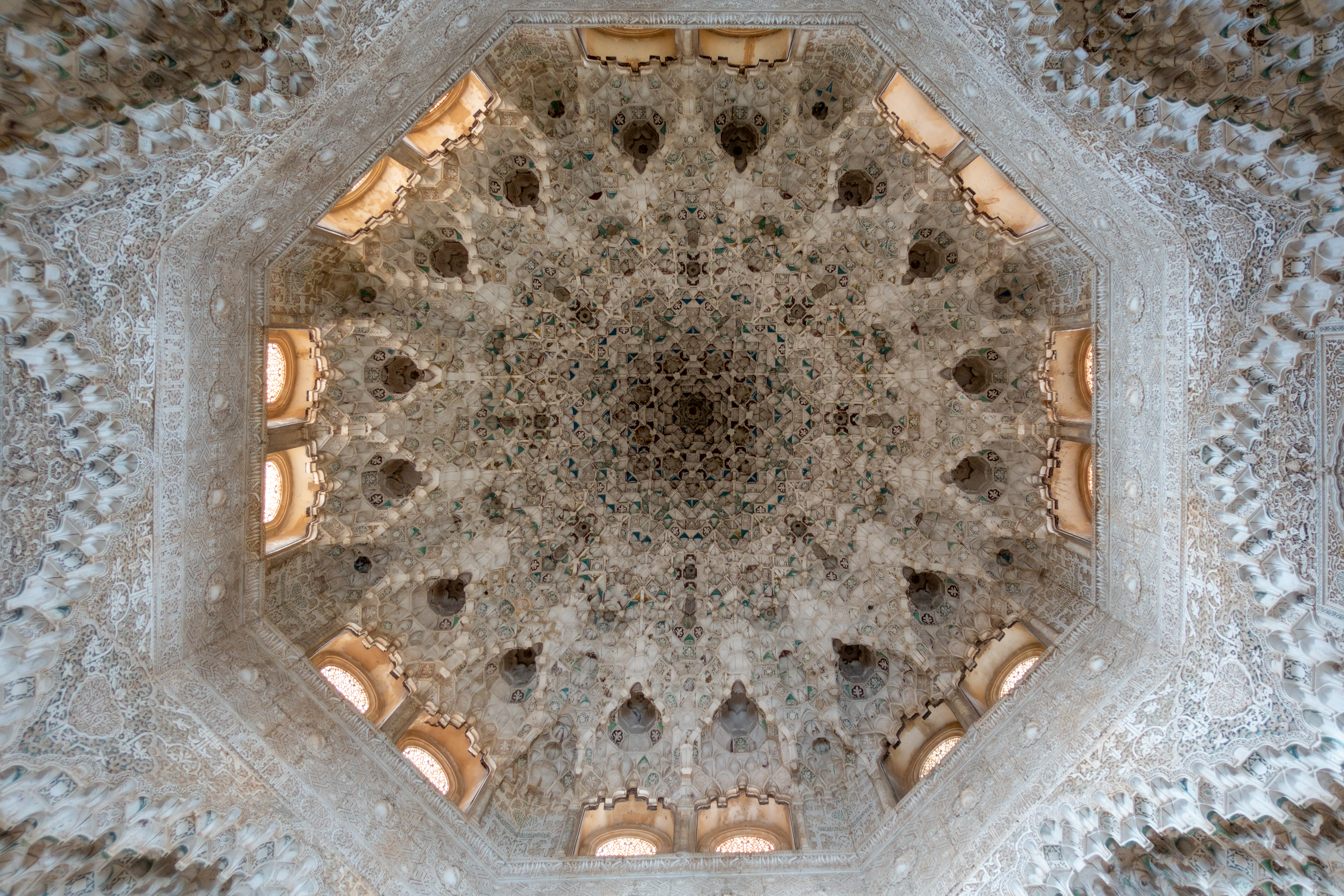
Muqarnas dome in the Sala de Dos Hermanas at the Alhambra in Granada, Spain (14th century)

Muqarnas (Arabic: مقرنص), also known in Iberian architecture as Mocárabe (from Arabic: مقربص, romanized: muqarbaṣ), is a form of three-dimensional decoration in Islamic architecture in which rows or tiers of niche-like elements are projected over others below. It is an archetypal form of Islamic architecture, integral to the vernacular of Islamic buildings, and typically featured in domes and vaults, as well as iwans, entrance portals, or other niches. It is sometimes referred to as honeycombs or stalactites.

Muqarnas is an invention of Islamic architecture. Its structure originated from the squinch and its purpose is to create a smooth, decorative zone of transition in an otherwise bare, structural space. This structure gives the ability to distinguish between the main parts of a building and serves as a transition from the walls of a square or rectangular room to a round dome or vault above it. Muqarnas could also form entire vaults and domes. From below, these compositions can create an elaborate visual effect based on the interplay of light and shadow across the surfaces sculpted into three-dimensional patterns.

Muqarnas most likely first developed in eleventh-century Iraq, although the earliest preserved examples are also found outside this region. As the technique became widespread in the 12th century, regional styles and variations developed across the Islamic world.

== Etymology ==
The etymology of the word muqarnas is somewhat vague, with its earliest use in Arabic dating to the 12th century. Several theories have been put forth about the possible origins of the word. With early scholarship connecting the origins of muqarnas to the Arabic word possibly stemming from the Arabic word qarnasi meaning "intricate work," while scholars in the 2000s have identified a potential origin for the term in the Greek word korōnis, meaning "cornice" or "ornamental molding".

The Spanish term mocárabe is derived from the Arabic term muqarbaṣ, which was also used to denote muqarnas in the western regions of the Islamic world. Its origin may be Koine Greek: κρηπίѕ, romanized: krēpís, lit. 'base, plinth'. It may also be related to the Arabic word mukrab meaning "solid, firm, bound".

== Structure ==
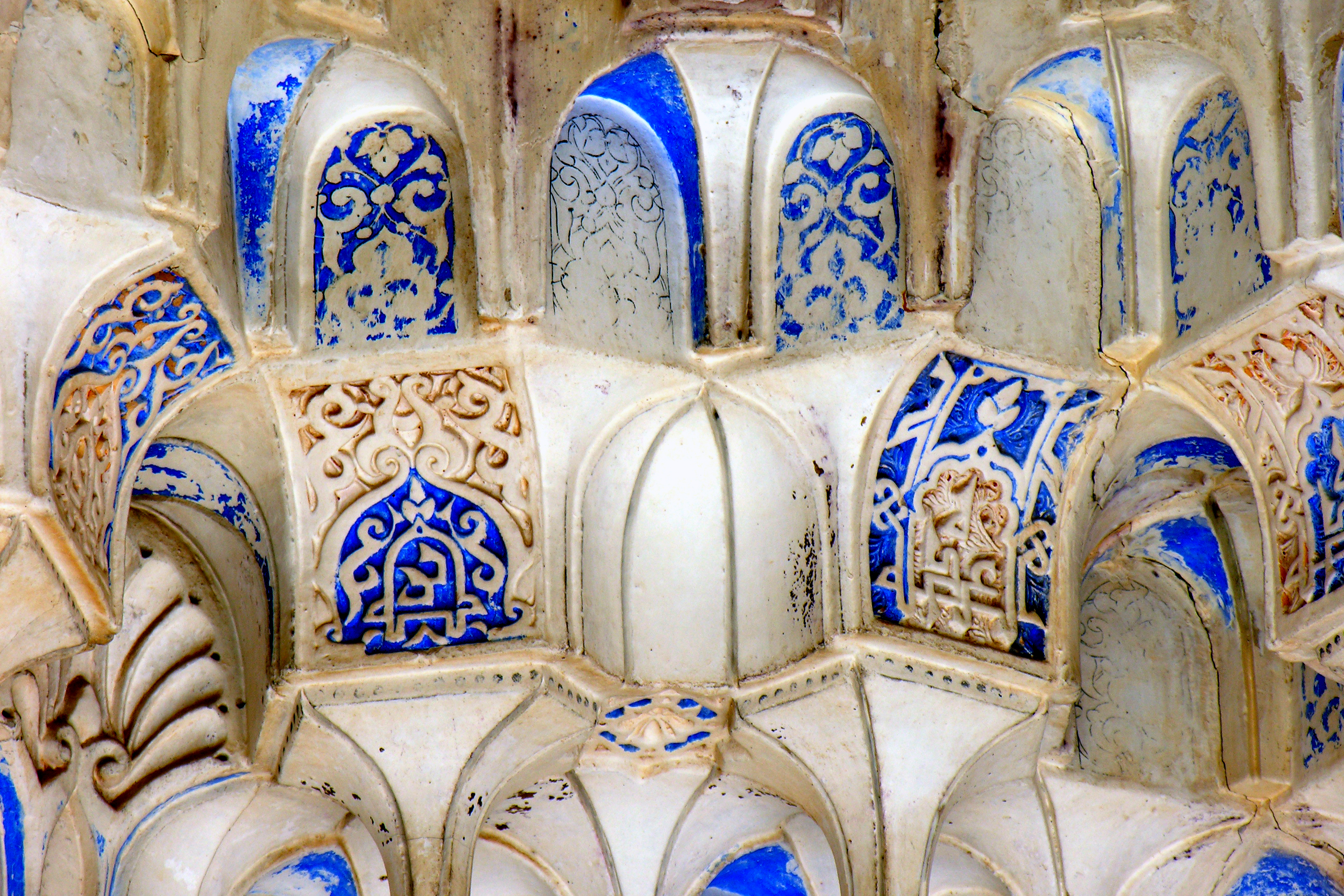
Close-up of muqarnas vaulting in the Alhambra (14th century) in Granada, Spain, showing horizontal courses of cells projecting over those below

Muqarnas consists of a series of niche-like elements or cells which are combined in a geometrical framework with a few axes of symmetry. The individual cells consist of a limited set of simple prismatic elements which are combined according to precise rules. Cells are organized in multiple levels overlapping and projecting over those below like corbels, thus creating a three-dimensional composition. Although following strict rules and using only a limited set of individual forms, the technique allows for the creation of highly complex and diverse compositions. The interplay of light and shadow across individual cells in a vast, geometric arrangement is what gives muqarnas its aesthetic visual effect. Western writers have often compared the resulting compositions to "stalactites" or "honeycombs" and these terms are often used in European languages to describe the technique.

Muqarnas vaulting covered with tilework, seen from below, in the iwan entrance of the Fatima Masumeh Shrine in Qom, Iran

Muqarnas is typically applied to the undersides of domes, pendentives, cornices, squinches, arches and vaults and is often seen in the mihrab of a mosque. It can also be applied across a flat surface as a decorative band or frieze. Its main function is ornamental and it is typically used to obscure or fill the structural transitions within a building. One of its main uses is to bridge the transition between the base of a circular dome and a square chamber below it, effectively serving as an evolution of the more traditional squinch.

The form and medium vary depending on the region in which they are found, as does the size of individual cells. In Syria, Egypt, and Turkey, muqarnas are usually constructed out of stone. In North Africa, they are typically constructed from plaster or wood. In Iran and Iraq, muqarnas are built with bricks which are sometimes covered in plaster or ceramic. Some plaster muqarnas compositions are attached to a hidden supporting framework or upper vault above, either glued or suspended by ropes.

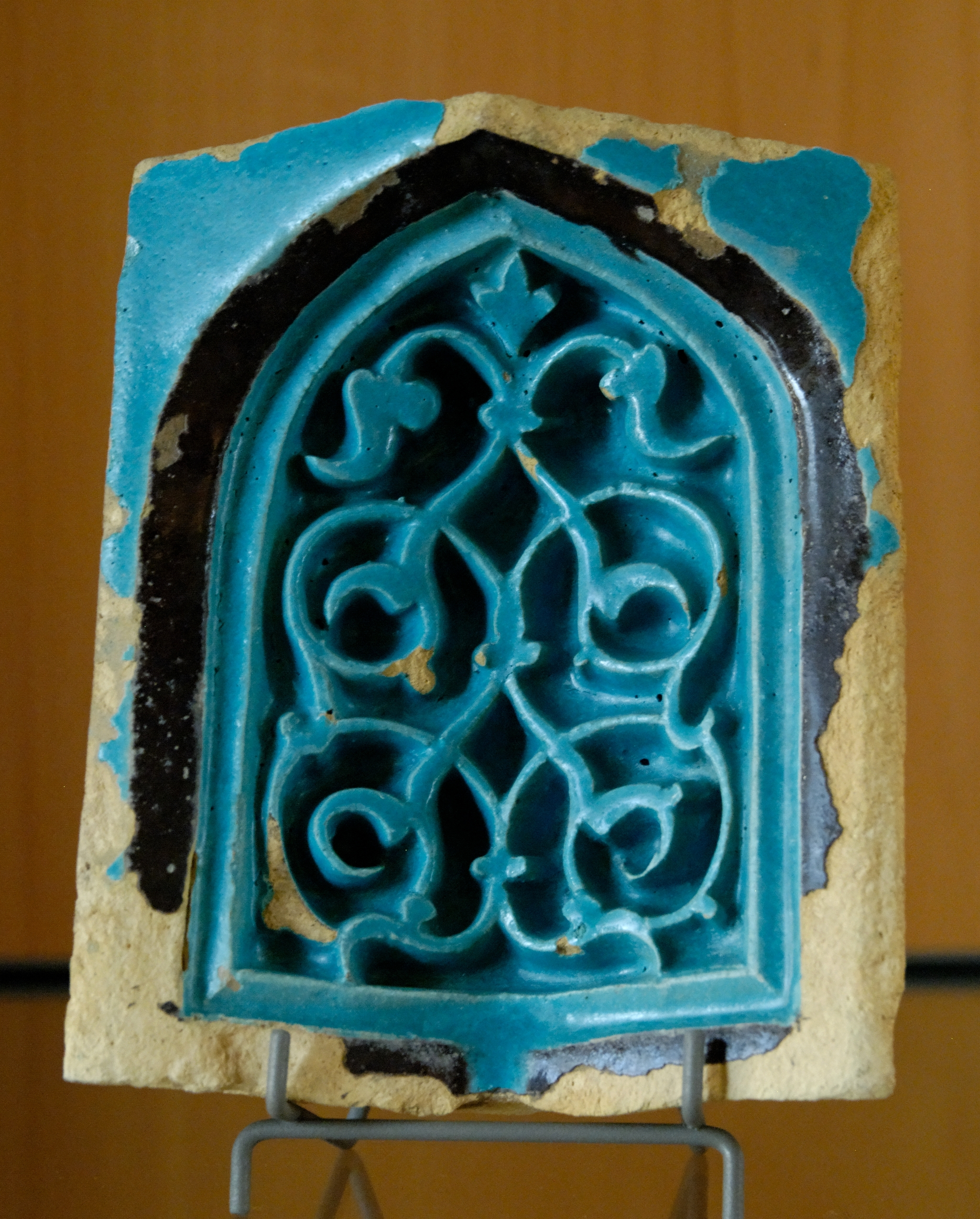
Example of a single muqarnas cell, made of earthenware with molded decoration and turquoise glaze, from the Shah-i-Zinda in Samarkand (first half of 15th century, Timurid period)

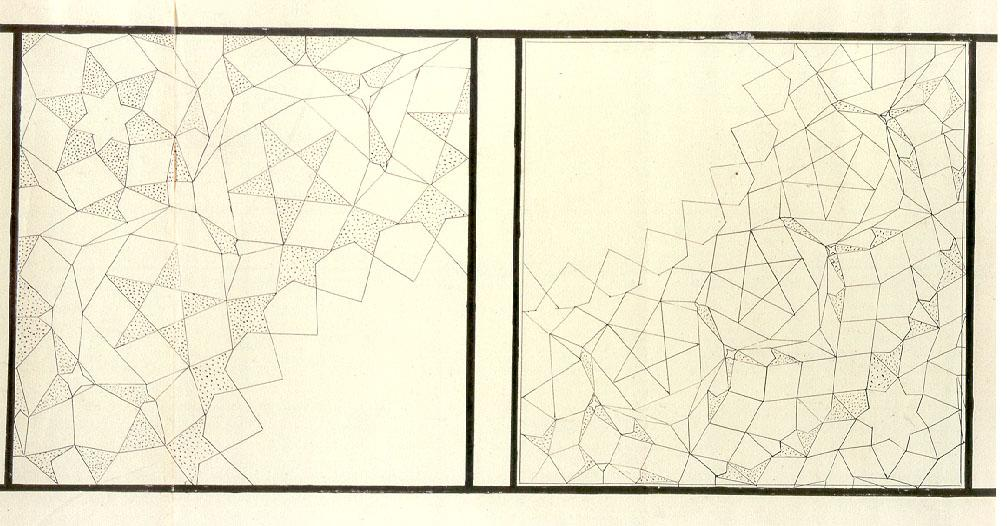
Medieval architect's plan of two muqarnas vaults, from the Topkapı Scroll (compiled possibly in the late 15th or 16th centuries)

== History ==
=== Origins ===
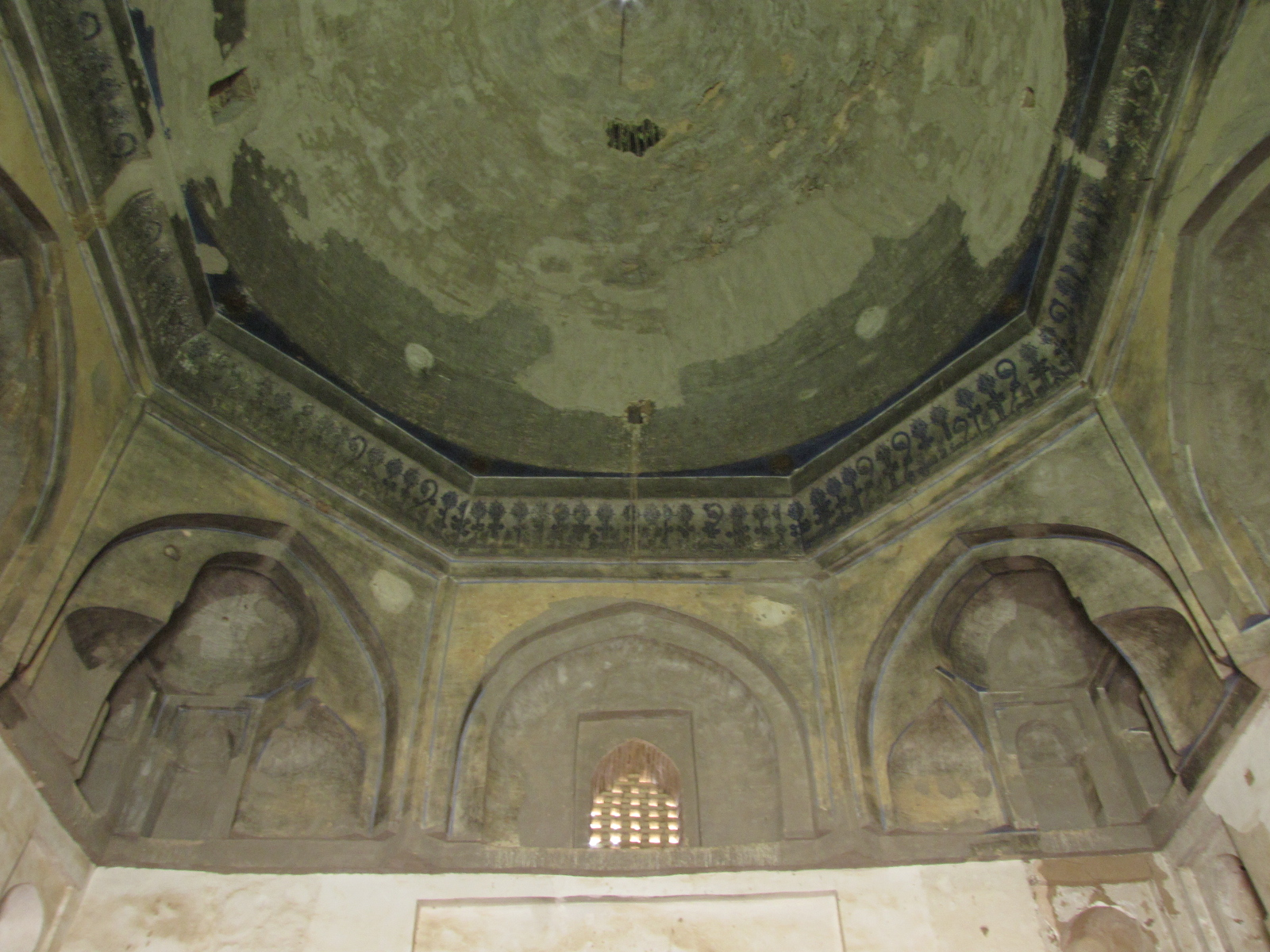
Early example of basic tripartite muqarnas squinches under the dome of the Duvazdah Imam Mausoleum in Yazd (1037–8)

The earliest monuments to make use of this feature date from the 11th century and are found in Iraq, North Africa, Iran, Central Asia, and Upper Egypt. This apparently near-simultaneous appearance in distant regions of the Islamic world has led to different scholarly theories about their origin and diffusion. Some early scholars of Islamic art, such as K. A. C. Creswell and Georges Marçais, believed that the evidence points to a simultaneous parallel development in these different regions. Others propose that they originated in one region at least a century earlier and then spread from there.

The earliest evidence of muqarnas-like elements, although only conjectural, comes from fragments of stucco found in Nishapur, Iran, dated to the 9th or 10th century. These fragments have concave triangular shapes and were reconstructed by excavators as a tripartite squinch. The earliest surviving examples preserved in situ are tripartite squinches used as transitional elements for domes and semi-domes. These examples include the Arab-Ata Mausoleum (977–978) in Tim (near Samarkand) in Uzbekistan, the Gunbad-i Qabus (1006–1007) in northeastern Iran, and the Duvazdah Imam Mausoleum (1037–1038) in Yazd, Iran. Based on the evidence from Nishapur and Tim, some scholars have theorized that muqarnas originated in northeastern Iran and that it was further developed in subsequent Great Seljuk architecture, as seen in the Seljuk domes of the Great Mosque of Isfahan (1088).

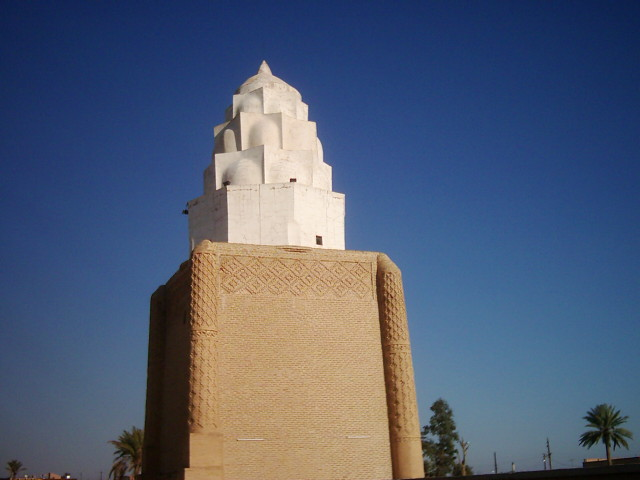
Imam Dur Mausoleum (1090), with exterior view of its muqarnas dome

The oldest full muqarnas dome to have survived to modern times was the Imam Dur Mausoleum at Samarra, completed in 1090. (This shrine was reported destroyed by ISIS in October 2014.) Based on this example and on the rapid spread of muqarnas vaulting across the Islamic world, some scholars believe that the primary role in its development was played instead by Abbasid Iraq, most likely in the early 11th century when the Abbasids in Baghdad were undergoing a renaissance. Yasser Tabbaa has argued that muqarnas domes in particular must have originated in Baghdad and that the far-reaching influence of the Abbasid capital enabled its rapid spread to other regions afterwards. Alicia Carrillo Calderero has proposed that the first muqarnas originated in the palaces of the Abbasid caliphs in Baghdad.

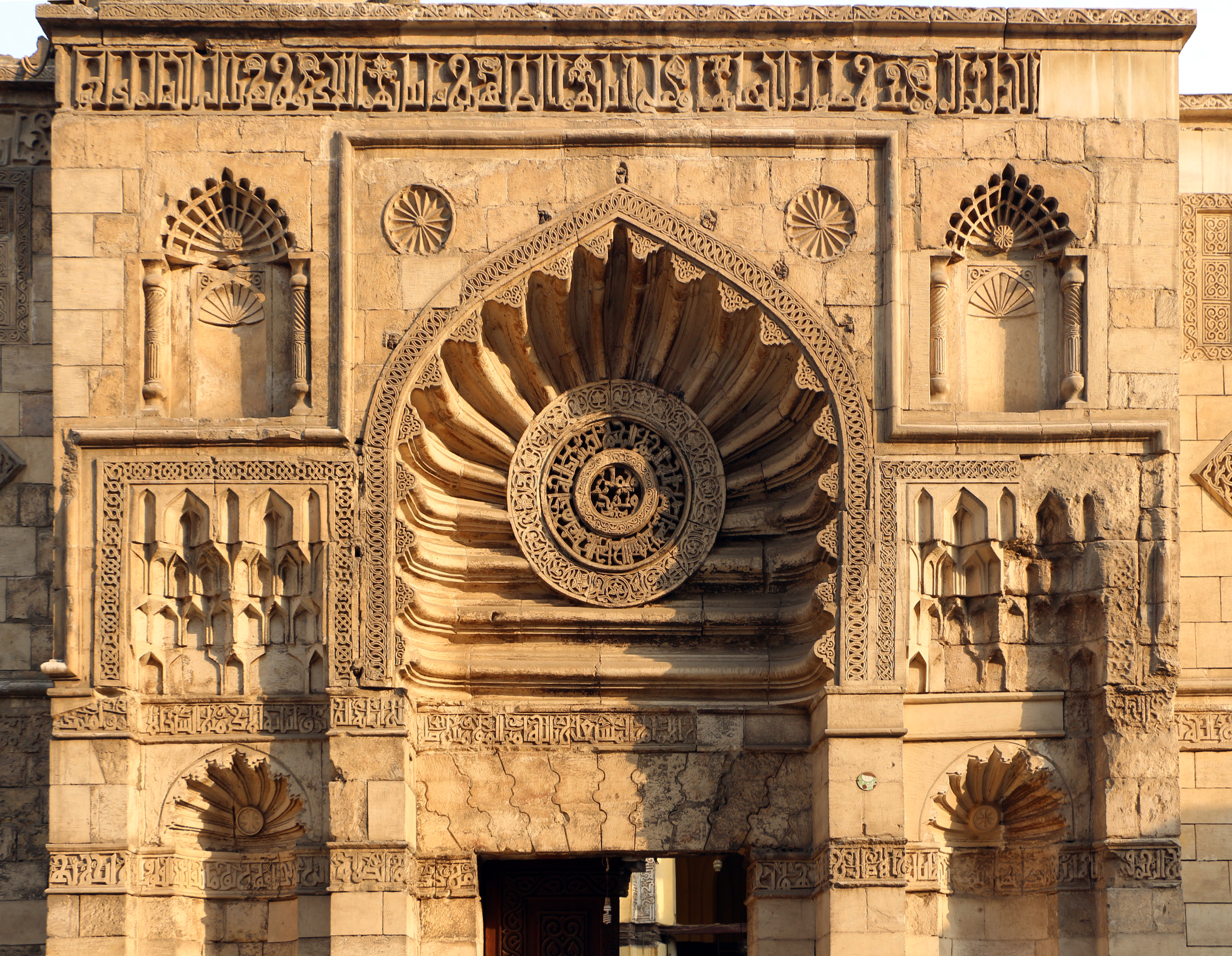
Façade of the Aqmar Mosque in Cairo (c. 1125, Fatimid period), with rectangular muqarnas niches to the left and right of the central doorway

In the case of Egypt, the earliest known and securely dated examples of muqarnas are from the Fatimid period and are found on the minaret of Badr al-Jamali's mashhad in Cairo, dated by inscription to 1085, and a cornice in Cairo's north wall (1085). The first fully realized, sophisticated use of muqarnas is found on the street façade of the Aqmar Mosque (1125) in Cairo. The advanced technical mastery of constructing muqarnas suggests that the technique and its associated architectural elements were imported from elsewhere. Jonathan Bloom speculates that the outside influence could originate from Syria, but notes that there are few Syrian monuments still standing that can support this claim. A cemetery in Aswan, containing many domed tombs from the 11th and 12th centuries, is a crucial example for the advancement in the development of the stalactite pendentive. In the mid-11th century, prosperous pilgrimage routes along the Red Sea and flourishing trade routes began in Cairo and dispersed throughout the Islamic empire. This allowed for a great exchange of ideas as well as a lucrative economy, capable of funding various architectural projects.

At Qal'at Bani Hammad in central Algeria, a royal city founded in the early 11th century by the Hammadid dynasty, archeologists discovered fragments of plaster which have been identified by some as the earliest appearance of muqarnas in the western Islamic world, but their dating and their identification as true muqarnas have been rejected or disputed by some scholars, including Yasser Tabbaa and Jonathan Bloom.

=== Later development ===
By the 12th century muqarnas had spread far and wide and from this point onward it would develop into different styles in different regions. A broad distinction in style and technique is sometimes made between muqarnas in the Maghreb and al-Andalus (the far western regions of the Islamic world) and muqarnas in the rest of the Islamic world.

==== Syria, Iraq and Iran up to the 13th century ====
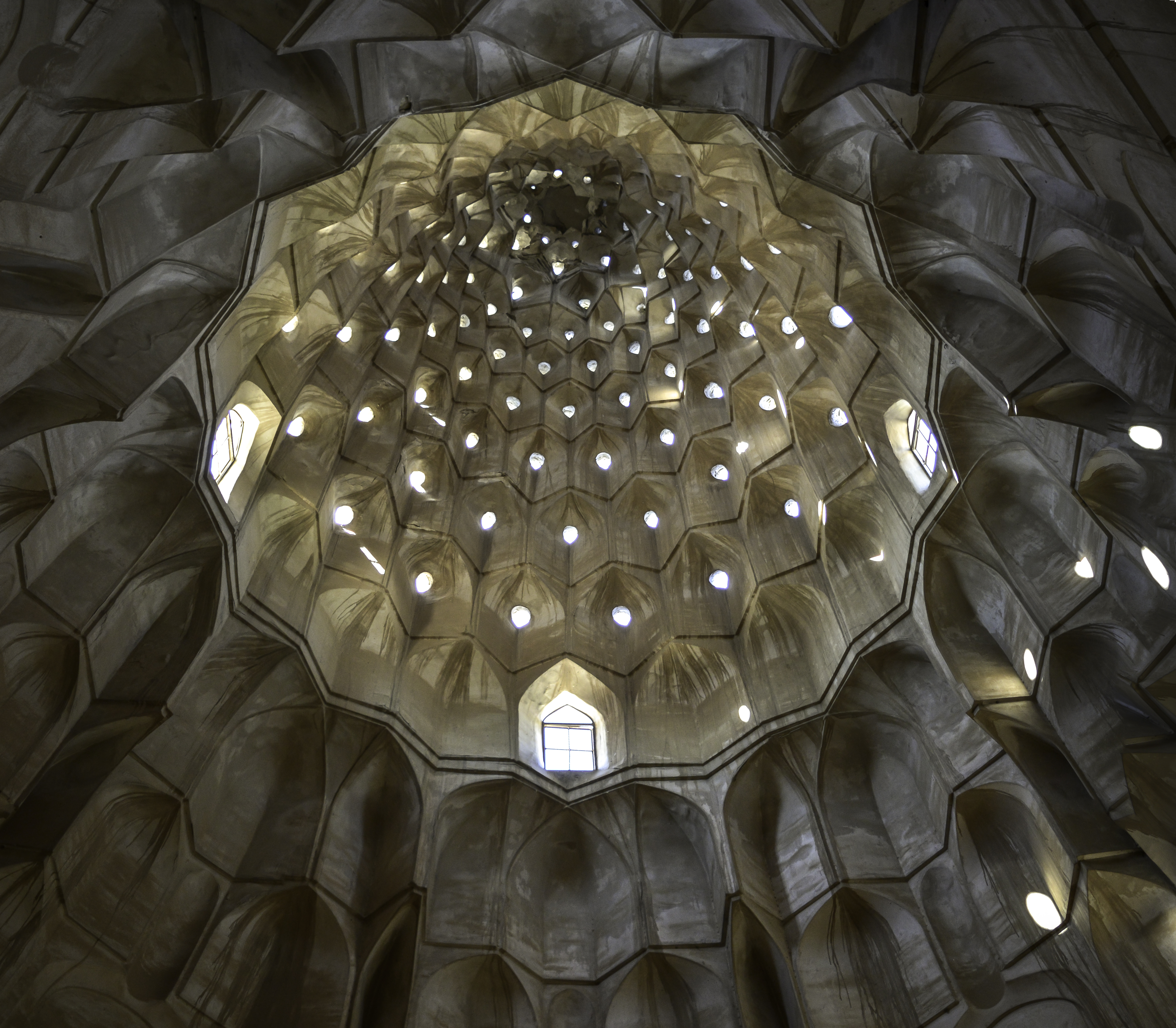
Muqarnas dome in the Mausoleum of Zumurrud Khatun (before 1202, late Abbasid period)

Muqarnas were still also used during the late Abbasid period such as ones in the Abbasid Palace in Baghdad, possibly built on the order of caliph al-Nasir (late 12th or early 13th century). The muqarnas vaults of this monument are exceptional in their detailed inscriptions and arabesque ornaments carved into the cells.

The largest examples of muqarnas domes can be found in Iraq and the Jazira region of eastern Syria, with a diverse variety of applications in domes, vaults, mihrabs, and niches. These domes date from a period of great architectural activity between the mid-12th century and the Mongol invasion in the mid-13th century. They follow the same model as the dome of the Imam Dur Mausoleum and have a pine cone-like appearance from the outside, as exemplified by the dome of the Mausoleum of Zumurrud Khatun, completed before 1202 in the late Abbasid period. This type of dome was also popular in Zengid Syria around the same time, as in the example of the Bimaristan of Nur al-Din in Damascus (1154), which also features a shallow muqarnas vault hood over its entrance portal.

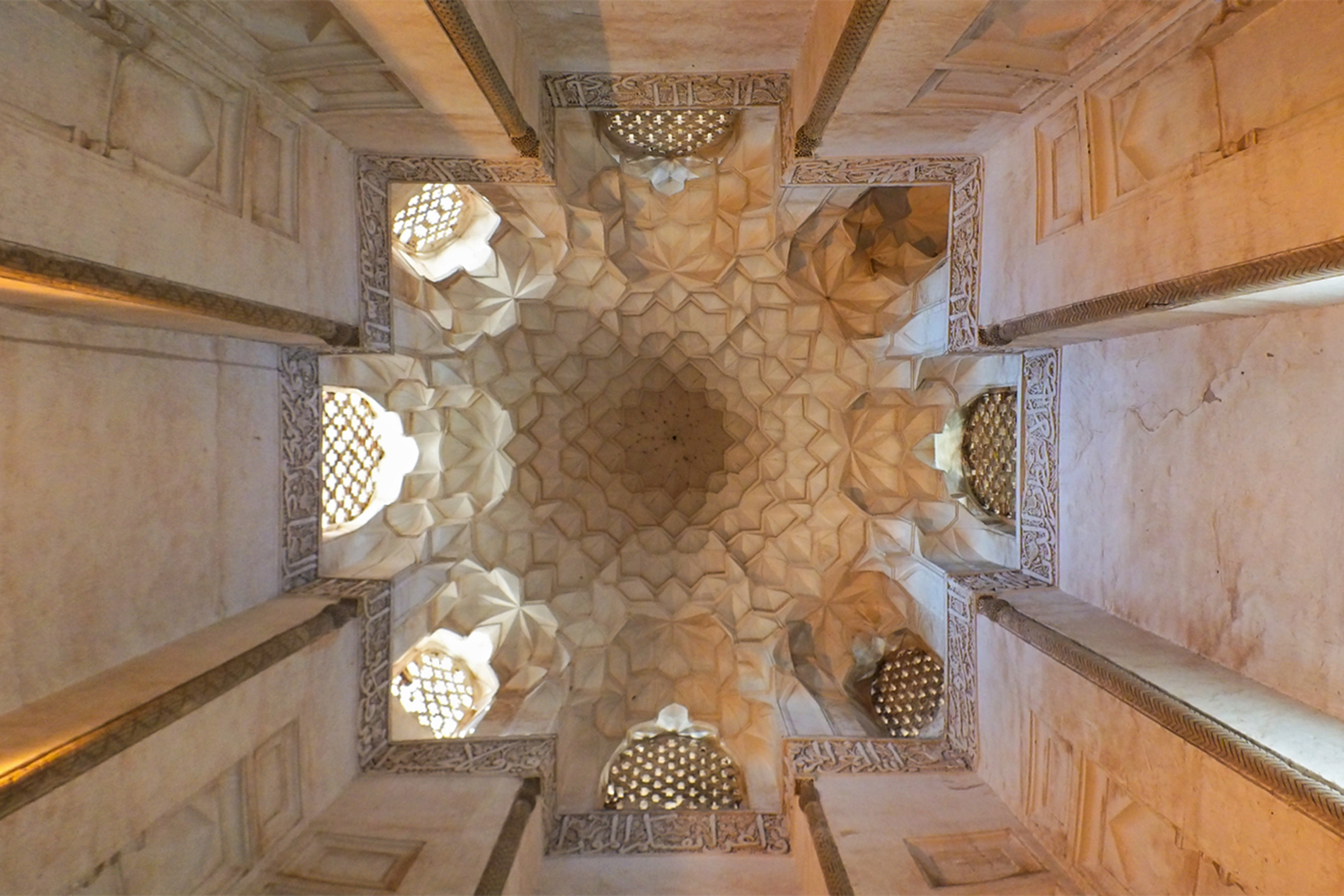
Dome of the Mausoleum of Shaykh 'Abd al-Samad in Natanz (1307, Ilkhanid period)

In northern Mesopotamia, muqarnas domes were often made of stucco inside a conical or pyramidal brick roof, as seen in Mausoleum of Imam Awn al-Din in Mosul (built in 1245, destroyed by ISIS in 2014). A closely related type is also seen in the Shrine of Shaykh 'Abd al-Samad in Natanz, Iran, which is dated to 1307 and demonstrates the sophistication muqarnas had reached in the Ilkhanid period. The oldest examples of entrance portals decorated with muqarnas vaulting in Iran also date to the Ilkhanid period.

==== Eastern Islamic world after the 14th century ====
Under the Timurids, ruling from Central Asia in the late 14th and 15th centuries, some extraordinary muqarnas vaults were built. Muqarnas was used on the exterior of large ribbed domes along the transition between the base of the dome and the cylindrical drum below. Timurid architecture also developed a new type of geometric ribbed vaulting, also known as "squinch net vaulting", where muqarnas was further employed to fill spaces between different segments of the vault. It is also in this period that the oldest surviving written work about muqarnas was composed, the Miftāḥ al-ḥisāb ('Key to Arithmetic'), written by Ghiyath al-Din al-Kashi in 1427. Muqarnas vaulting nonetheless became somewhat less popular in the region during this period.

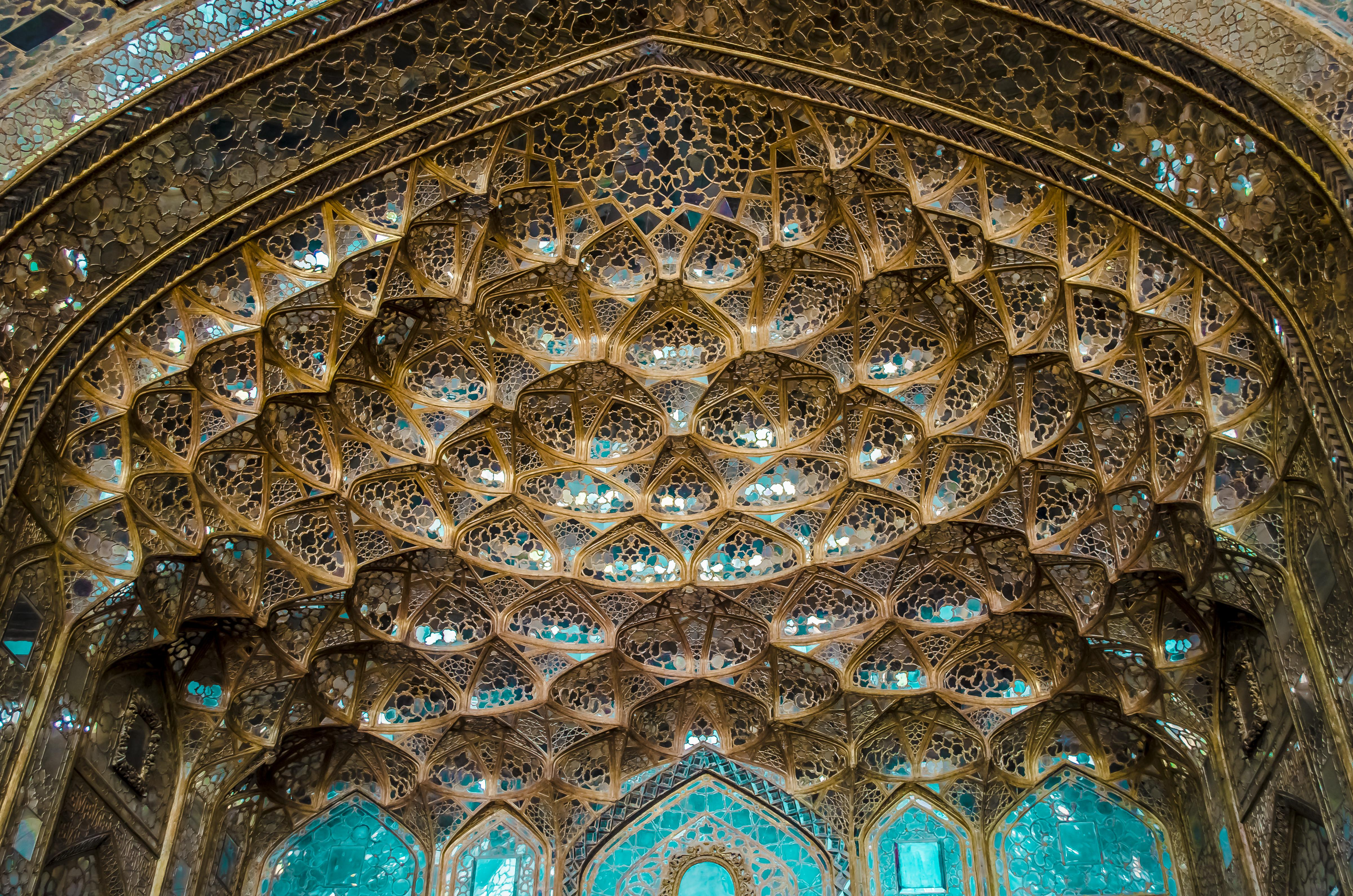
Muqarnas vault with covered with mirror mosaics in an iwan inside Chehel Sotoun in Isfahan (from a 1706–7 restoration, Safavid period)

In Safavid Iran of the 16th to early 18th centuries, muqarnas was no longer used to cover the interiors of religious buildings but was still used to fill the vaults of iwans. Like other surfaces in Safavid architecture, they were typically covered in colourful tilework. In the 18th century, Iranian muqarnas began to be covered with mirror glass mosaics, with one of the earliest examples found at Chehel Sotoun in Isfahan, dating to its restoration in 1706–7. This style was used afterward to decorate the interiors of major Shi'a shrines in Iran and Iraq.

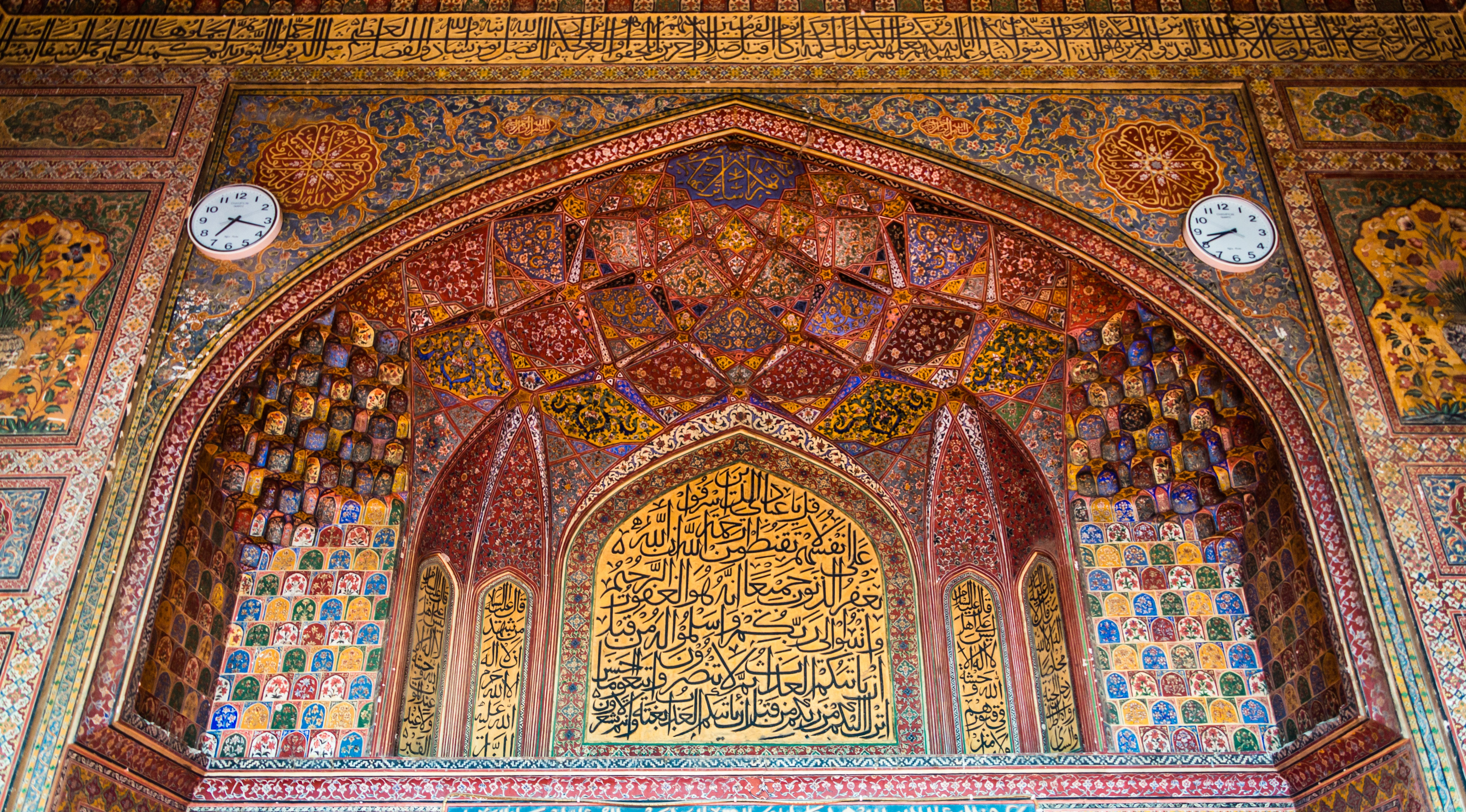
Muqarnas and geometric vaulting inside the Wazir Khan Mosque in Lahore (early 17th century, Mughal period)

Muqarnas was also a recurring embellishment of vaults and iwans in Mughal architecture in the Indian subcontinent. Experimentation with new styles of vaulting was characteristic of the reign of Jahangir (r. 1605–1627). Muqarnas with small lozenge-shaped cells were combined with a related type of geometrically patterned (squinch net) vaulting, usually based on a star motif. The latter was probably derived from the influence of Safavid architecture. In Mughal decoration, muqarnas are often covered with arabesque decoration, crafted with molded plaster and fitted to each of the cells.

==== Mamluk Egypt and Syria ====
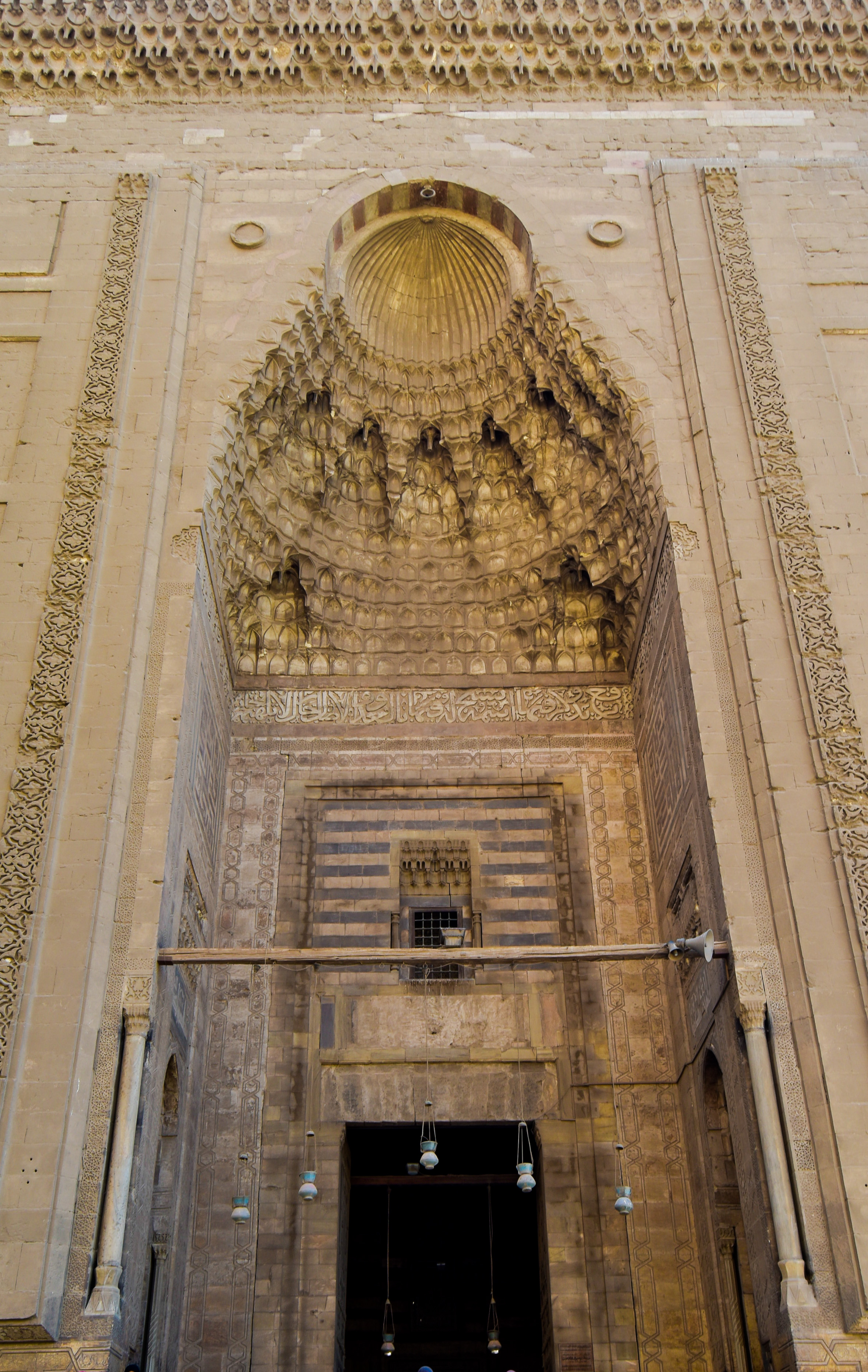
Stone muqarnas vault and scalloped semi-dome in the entrance portal of Mosque-Madrasa of Sultan Hasan (1356–1363, Mamluk period)

Muqarnas in carved stone was characteristic of Ayyubid and Mamluk architecture from the 13th to early 16th centuries in Egypt and the Levant. The Mamluk sultan Baybars introduced to Egypt the Syrian tradition of entrance portals with a muqarnas hood. These subsequently developed into spectacular designs used in at the entrances of both religious monuments and private palaces, forming some of the most accomplished stone muqarnas designs in the Islamic world. Muqarnas was also frequently used to cover the pendentives inside domed chambers.

Muqarnas vaulting in Mamluk portals usually culminated in a scalloped or shell-shaped semi-dome at the top. Variations of this style became prevalent in the entrance portals of the 14th century, with the most monumental example being that of the Mosque-Madrasa of Sultan Hasan in Cairo. Among the other examples, several unusual portals have muqarnas covering the underside of a flat vault, most notably at the Mosque of Amir Ulmas (1330). Muqarnas became less prominent in Mamluk portals during the 15th century.

==== Anatolia and the Ottoman Empire ====
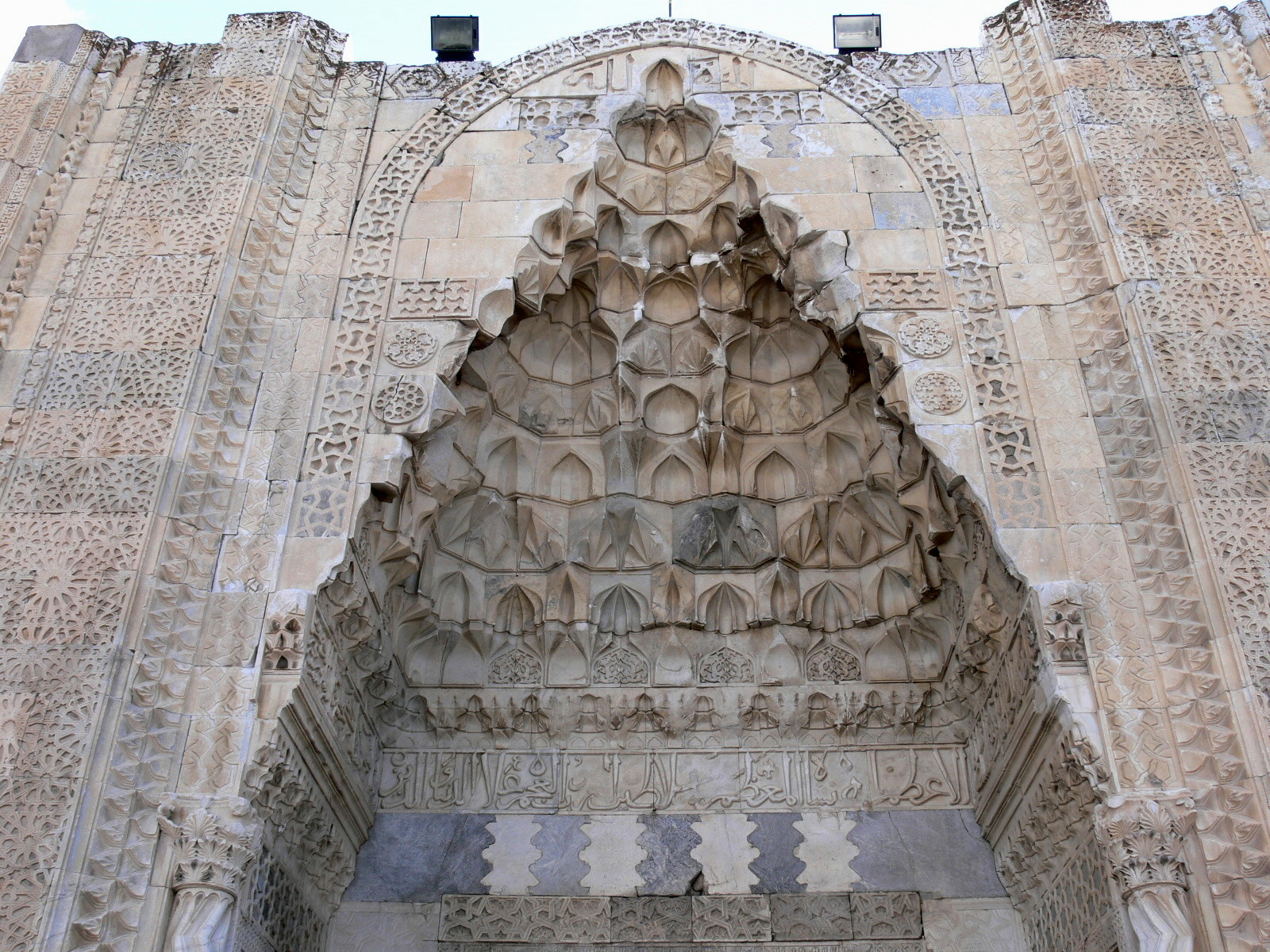
Muqarnas vault over the entrance of the Sultan Han (1229, Seljuk period) in Turkey

In Anatolia, the monuments of the Anatolian Seljuks and other local dynasties made use of muqarnas inside mihrabs (sometimes covered in tilework), on the capitals of columns, in the transitional zones of minaret balconies, and over masonry entrance portals. It was used less in the pendentives and squinches of domes, where other techniques came to be employed instead.

The muqarnas-vaulted entrance portal was strongly associated with Seljuk royal patronage in the 13th century and spread more widely across Anatolia as the century progressed. It typically had a pyramidal or triangular shape, more akin to a corbelled vault than a half-dome. This kind of muqarnas vault also appears in some Cairene Mamluk portals, particularly in the shape of the pyramidal muqarnas vault of the Madrasa of Umm al-Sultan Sha'ban, possibly due to Anatolian influence. During the 14th century, Mamluk influence is in turn apparent in the design of muqarnas portals in Anatolia.

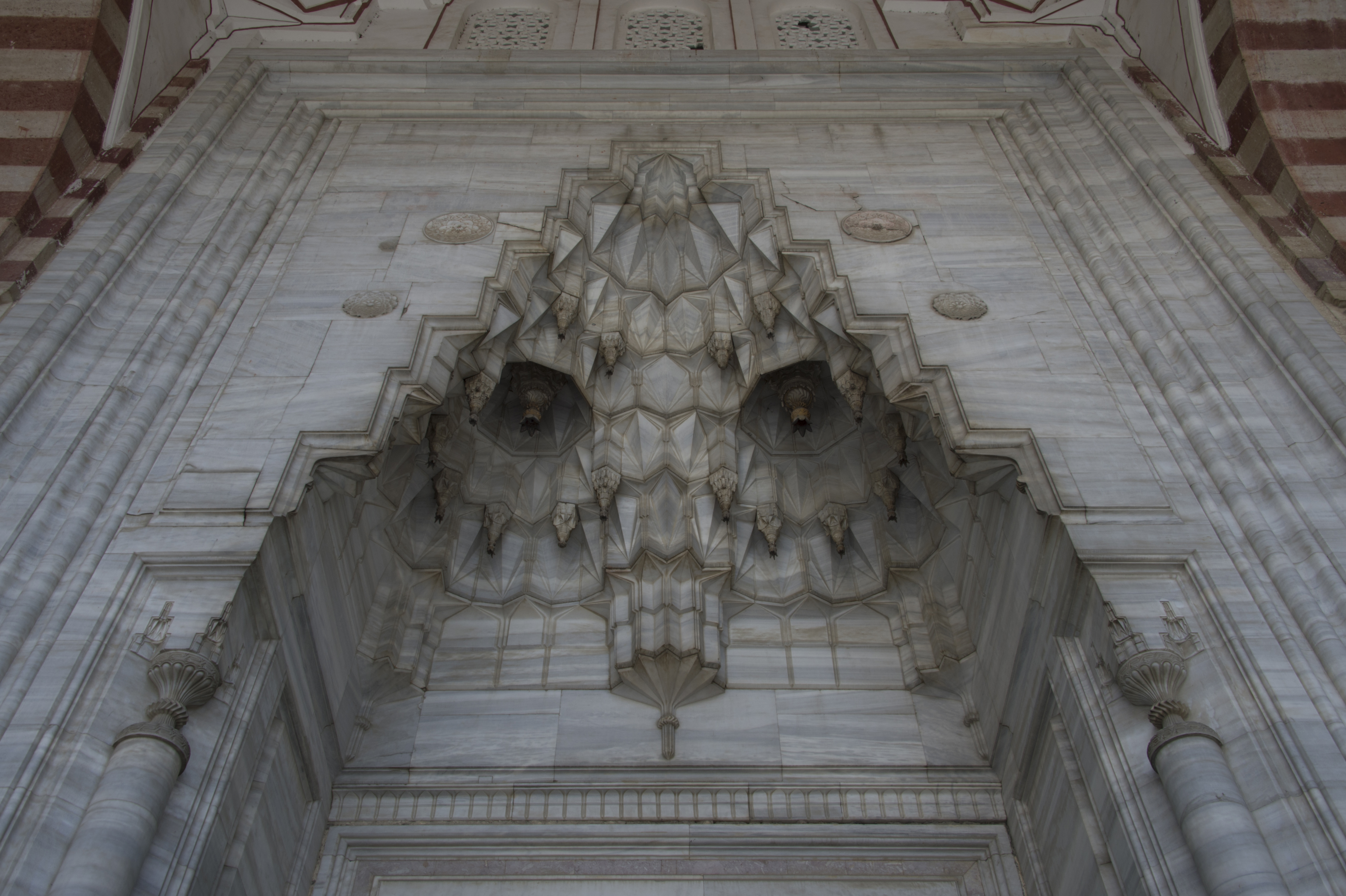
Muqarnas portal at the Selimiye Mosque in Edirne (1568–1574, Ottoman period)

Under the Ottomans, the tradition of Seljuk muqarnas continued into Ottoman architecture, although it diminished in importance during the Classical period in the 16th century, when it was only one element in a wider decorative repertoire. It was mainly used in entrance portals, niches, and column capitals. It eventually faded from use in the 18th century, when European-influenced decoration began to predominate in the Ottoman Baroque period.

==== Maghreb and al-Andalus ====
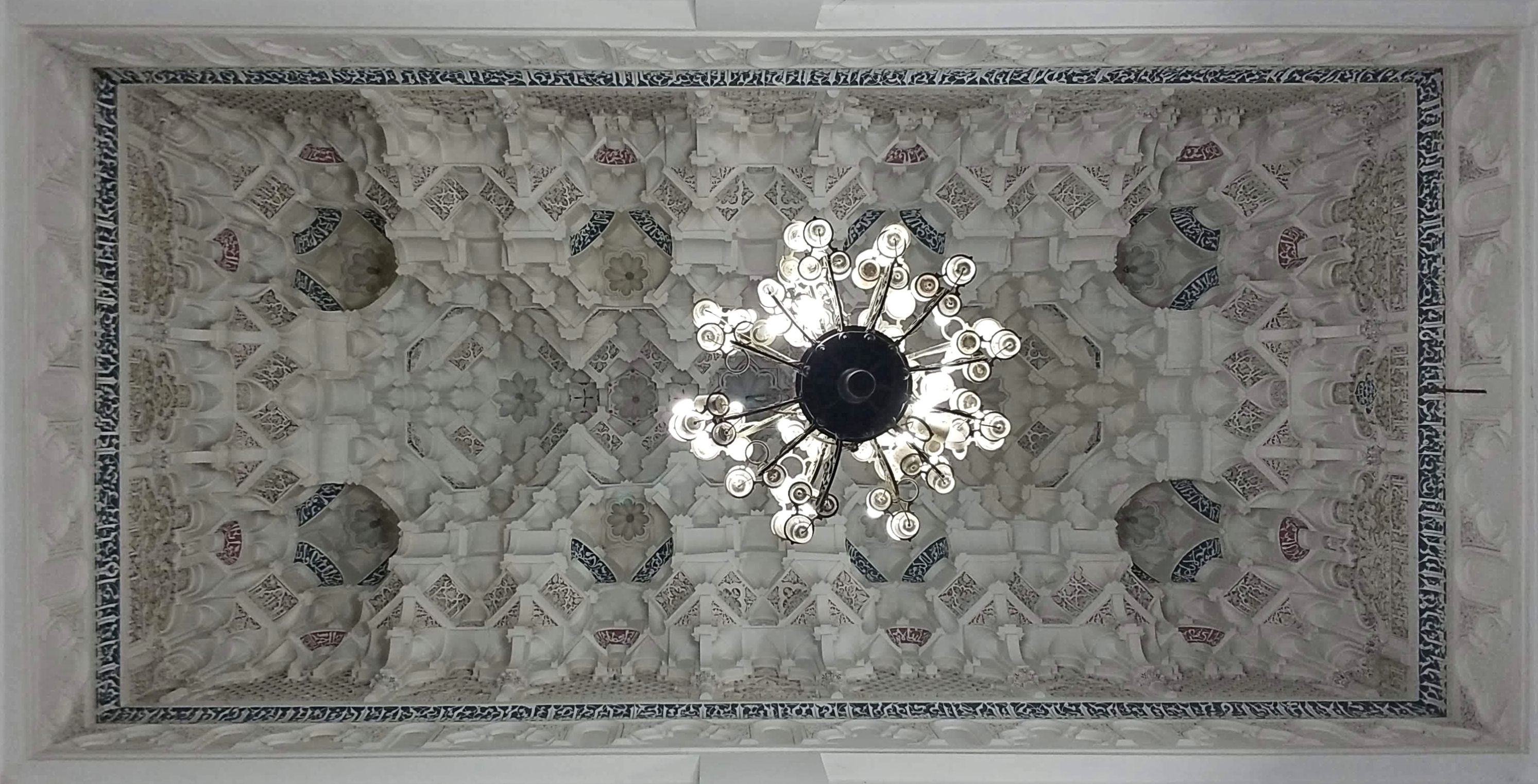
One of the muqarnas vaults in the Qarawiyyin Mosque in Fez, created between 1134 and 1143 under the Almoravid patronage. The purely decorative vault is made of plaster and suspended from a hidden wood framework above.

In the western Islamic world, muqarnas decoration was definitively introduced during the reign of the Almoravid emir Ali ibn Yusuf. The earliest examples, although limited to small details of larger domes, are found in the Almoravid Qubba in Marrakesh, Morocco, built probably in 1117 or 1125, and in the stucco openwork dome in front of the mihrab of the Great Mosque of Tlemcen, Algeria, dated to 1136. The earliest complete muqarnas vaults in the western Islamic world are located in the Qarawiyyin Mosque in Fez, dating to Ali ibn Yusuf's major expansion of the mosque between 1134 and 1143. These vaults are made of plaster and suspended from hidden wooden struts above them. They are richly decorated, with individual cells painted with vegetal motifs and highlighted in red and blue.

Further north, in al-Andalus (present-day Spain), the oldest surviving muqarnas fragments were found in a palace built by Muhammad Ibn Mardanish (r. 1147–1172), excavated under the present-day Monastery of Santa Clara in Murcia. The fragments are painted with images of musicians and other figures. It's possible that an even older instance of muqarnas existed in a palace inside the Alcazaba of Almería, dating to the reign of the Taifa ruler al-Mu'tasim (r. 1051–1091). The evidence for its existence comes from a written account by al-Udhri, although the wording may be open to multiple interpretations.

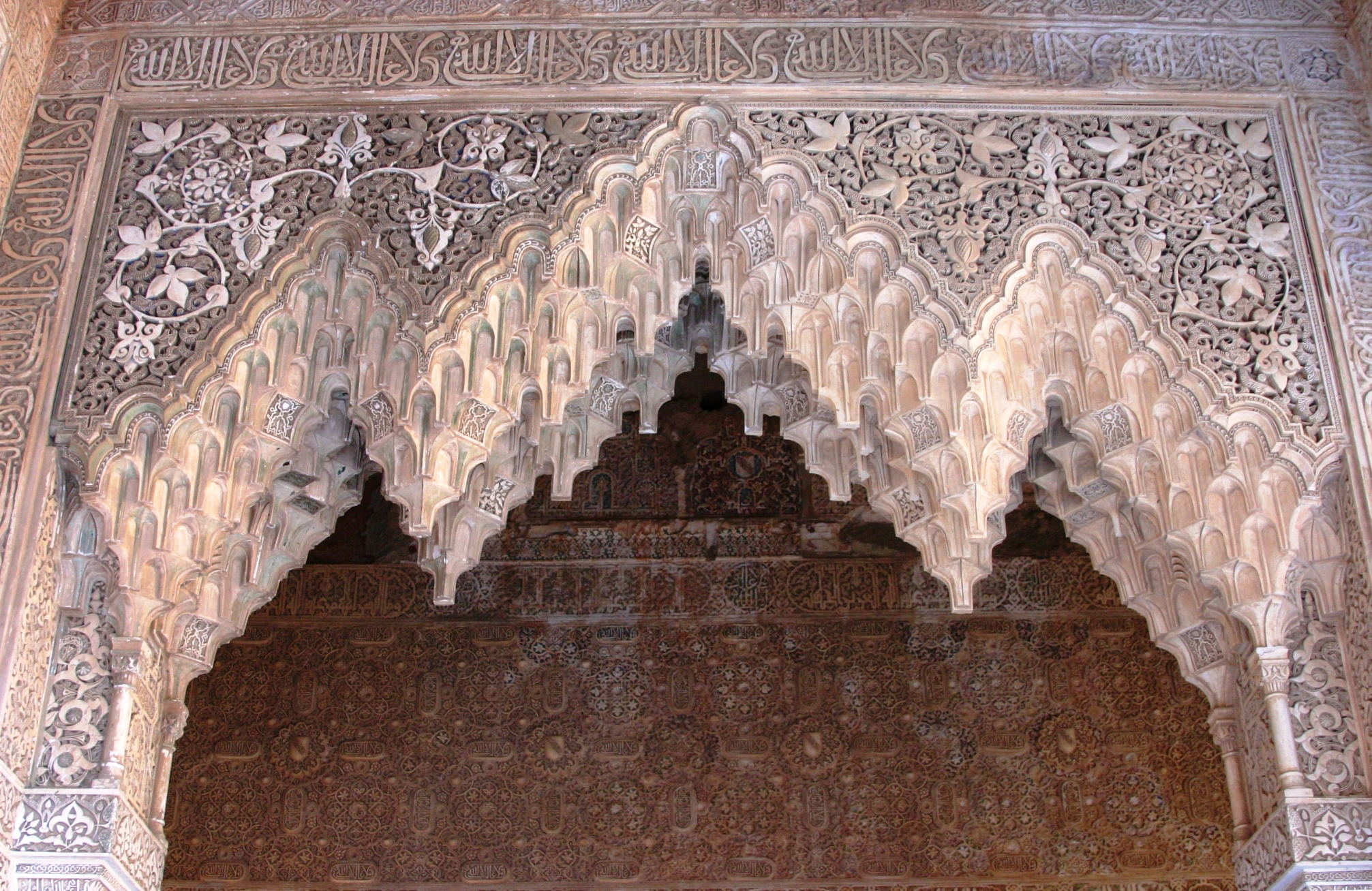
Archway with muqarnas in the Palace of the Lions (14th century, Nasrid period) at the Alhambra in Granada

Muqarnas in the Maghreb and al-Andalus evolved a different style and execution from that of muqarnas in the regions to the east. In this western region, the technique was also traditionally denoted by the term muqarbaṣ in Arabic and it can also be denoted by the present Spanish term mocárabe. This style of muqarnas reached a new level of standardization and always employed the same repertoire of eight possible shapes, regardless of the complexity of the overall composition. Whereas muqarnas in other regions is typically organized in horizontal layers projecting over each other, those in the west are organized in vertical layers. Wood and stucco were also the preferred mediums of muqarnas construction.

Muqarnas eventually reached its highest level of sophistication in the Alhambra of Granada, built by the Nasrids. The most impressive domes are found in the Palace of the Lions, built in the 14th century. The dome over the chamber known today as the Sala de Dos Hermanas ('Hall of the Two Sisters') is one of the most magnificent muqarnas domes in Islamic art, consisting of at least 5000 cells that unfold from a central summit downward into sixteen miniature domes around the dome's perimeter.

Muqarnas was also employed in the constructions sponsored by non-Muslim patrons in the Iberian Peninsula, referred to as Mudéjar art. It continued to be used up to the 17th century in chapels, synagogues, and palaces. The Asunción chapel in the Abbey of Santa María la Real de Las Huelgas (near Burgos in northern Spain) features muqarnas and other Islamic-style decoration compatible with Almohad craftsmanship.

==== Outside the Muslim world ====
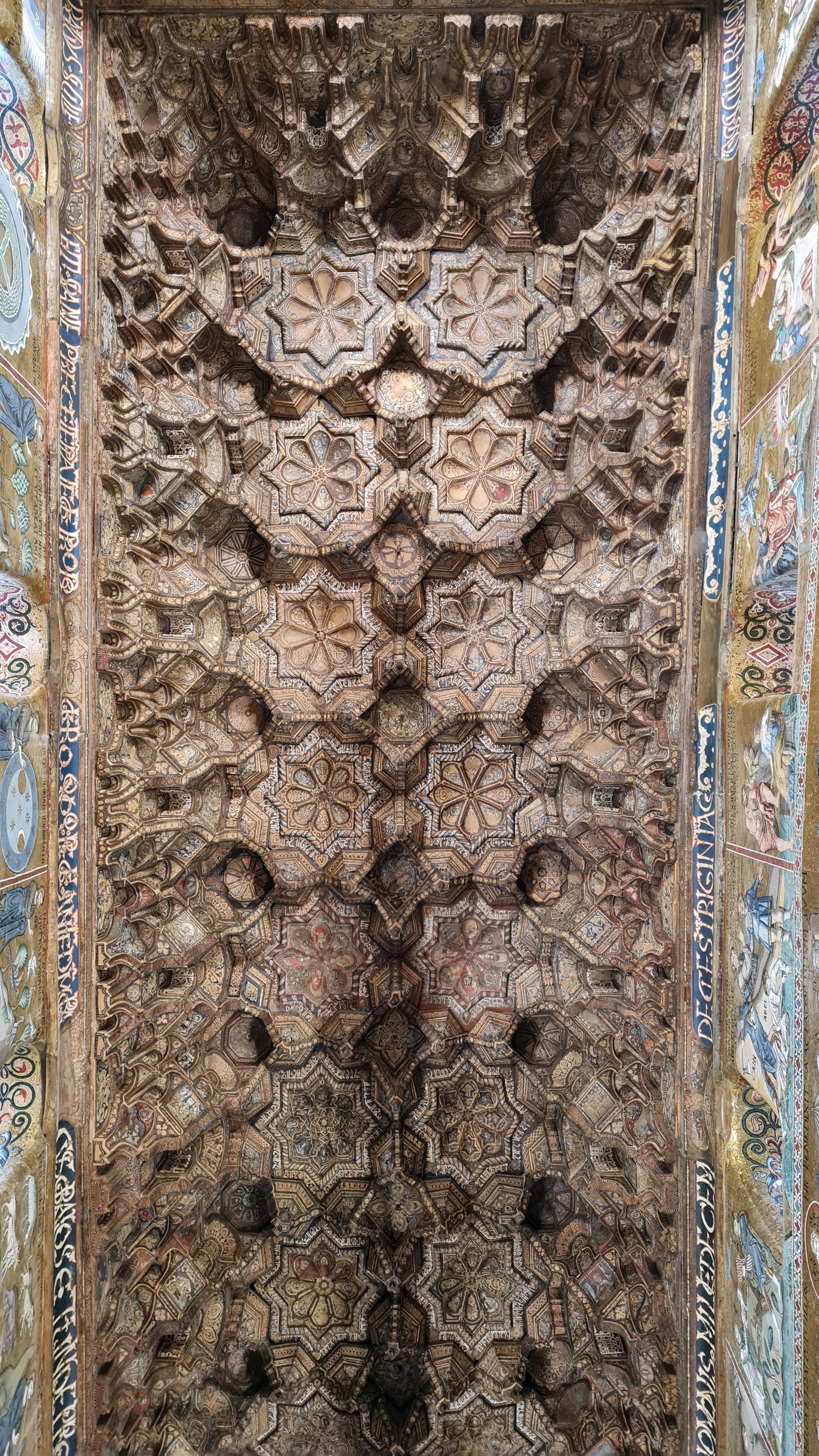
Painted wood muqarnas in the Cappella Palatina in Palermo (circa 1140), commissioned by Roger II of Sicily

Muqarnas was also used by Christian patrons outside the Muslim world, in regions influenced by Islamic art and culture. It is found in some monuments of Arab-Norman architecture in 12th-century Sicily, in the period after Muslim Sicily was conquered by the Christian Normans. The most impressive example from this time is in the Cappella Palatina (c. 1140) in Palermo, a church whose central nave is covered by the largest rectangular muqarnas vault in the world, made of carved and painted wood.

Armenian architecture in the 13th century also made use of muqarnas, spurred by the influence of contemporary Islamic architecture. Examples of this can be found in the Geghard Monastery, the Gandzasar Monastery, the church in Astvatsankal (all in present-day Armenia), and at the Church of the Apostles and the Church of St Gregory of the Illuminator in Ani (in present-day eastern Turkey). In many of these examples, muqarnas vaults are recurring features in the gavits (narthexes) of the churches, which were the locus of much innovation and experimentation in medieval Armenian architecture. These borrowings of Islamic architectural motifs may have been due to either Ilkhanid or Seljuk influences in the region, although the wide geographic spread of muqarnas usage in this period makes it difficult to pinpoint any specific influence with certainty.

Muqarnas is also featured in the Byzantine-built Church of Hagia Sophia in Trabzon (Trebizond), completed in the 13th century. Antony Eastmond, in analyzing this detail of the church and comparing it with other non-Muslim monuments of the period (including Armenian constructions), suggests that muqarnas could have been adopted into a wider repertoire of architectural motifs and ideas that was shared across Anatolia and the surrounding region at this time.

== Symbolism ==
As with the origins of the muqarnas form, there are multiple theories about its possible symbolic meaning or function. Oleg Grabar, in his work on the Alhambra in Granada, suggested that the large muqarnas domes in the Palace of the Lions were representations of the rotating heavens.

Yasser Tabbaa has argued that the muqarnas dome was originally intended as an architectural representation of the atomist and occasionalist view of the universe endorsed by Muslim philosophers, particularly the version formulated by al-Baqillani (d. 1013) and endorsed by the Abbasid caliph al-Qadir (r. 991–1031), roughly around the time that muqarnas began to appear. By subdividing the continuous surface of a dome into a large number of small units organized in a complex pattern, while also de-emphasizing the former squinches and making the dome appear unsupported, architects were representing a universe divided into atoms and held together by God. Tabbaa goes on to suggest that the symbolism of the muqarnas dome as a representation of the rotating dome of heaven, proposed by Grabar, could have been a secondary interpretation that developed in subsequent centuries.

The muqarnas domes were often constructed above portals of entry for the purpose of establishing a threshold between two worlds. The celestial connotation of the muqarnas structure represents a passage from "the functions of living, or of awaiting eternal life that is expressed by geometric forms."

== Gallery ==
Exterior of the Bimaristan of Nur al-Din in Damascus (1154), with a muqarnas hood over the entrance and a muqarnas dome behind it

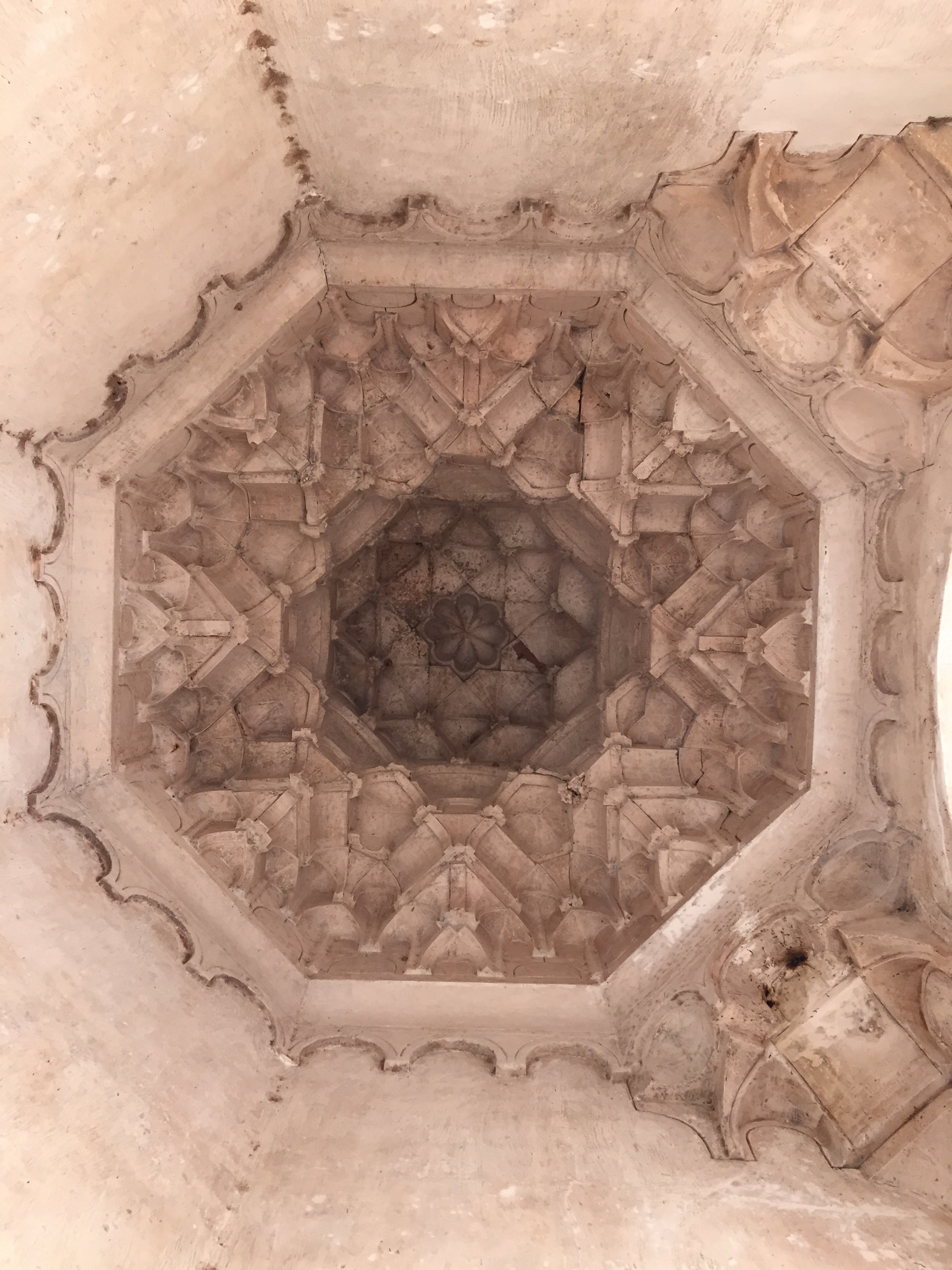
Muqarnas cupola inside the mihrab of the Tinmal Mosque in Morocco (circa 1148, Almohad period)

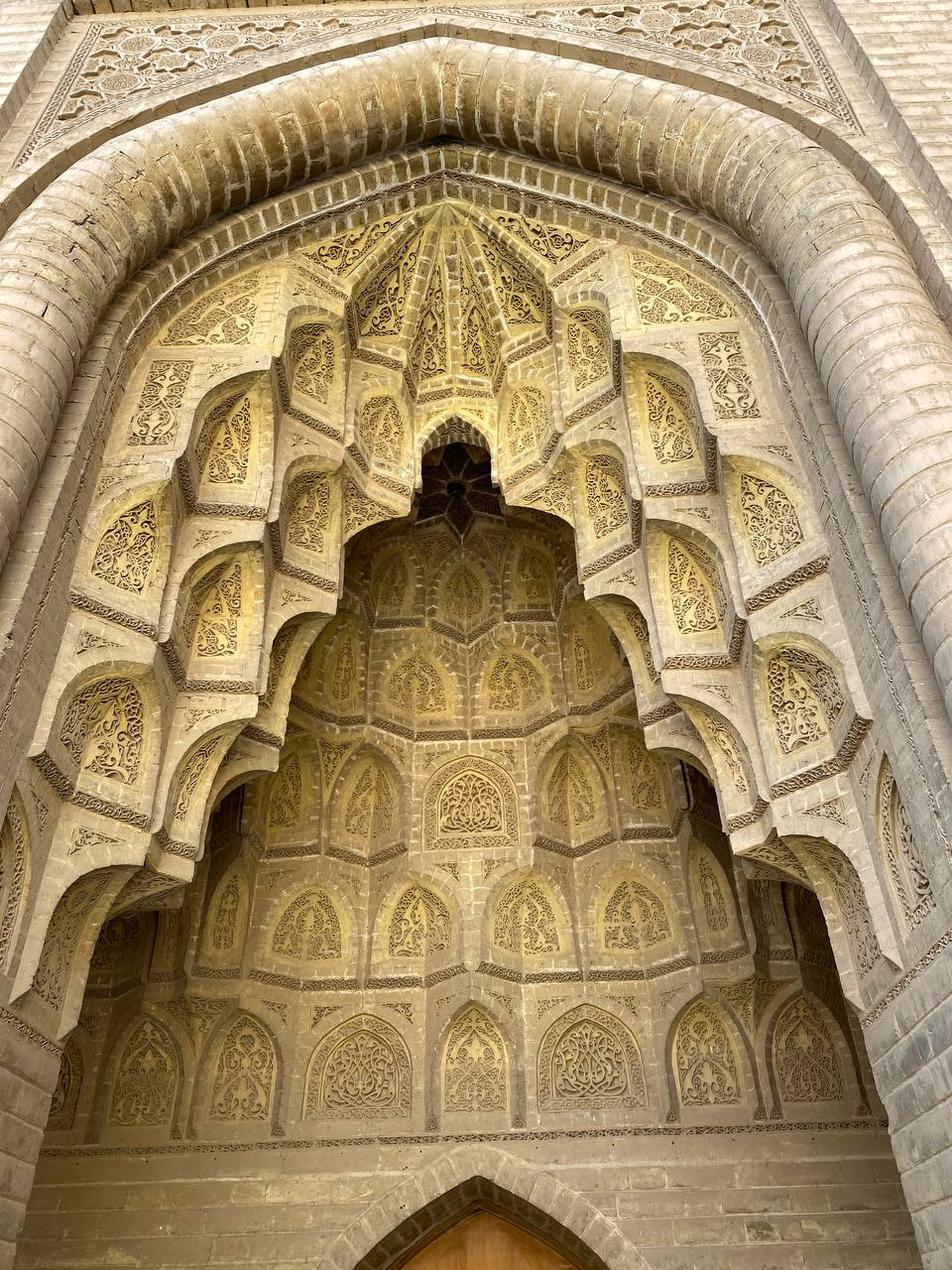
Muqarnas in one of the iwans of the Abbasid Palace in Baghdad (late 12th or early 13th century), late Abbasid period

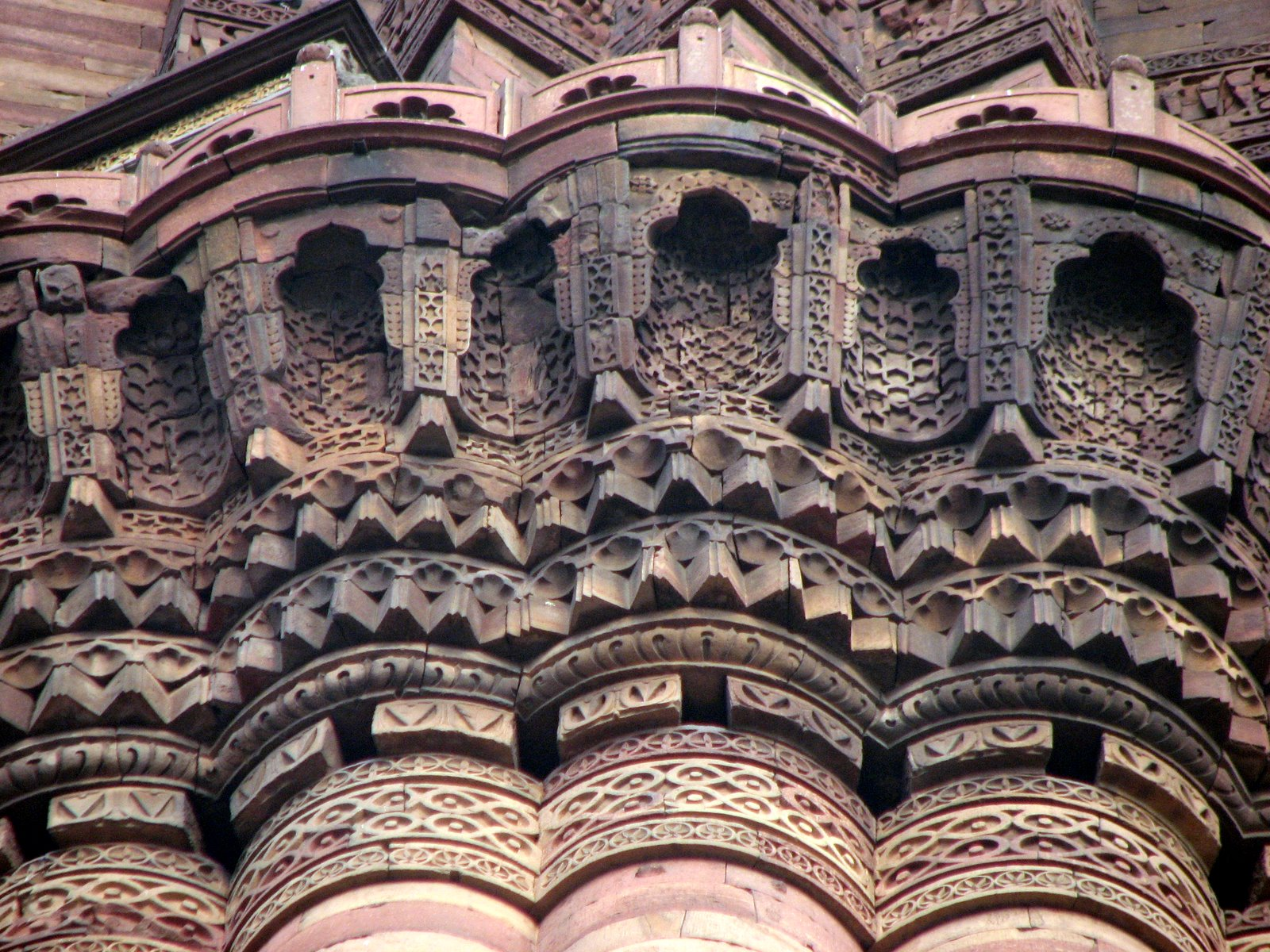
Muqarnas corbelling around the balcony of the Qutb Minar in Delhi (1199–1220, Delhi Sultanate)

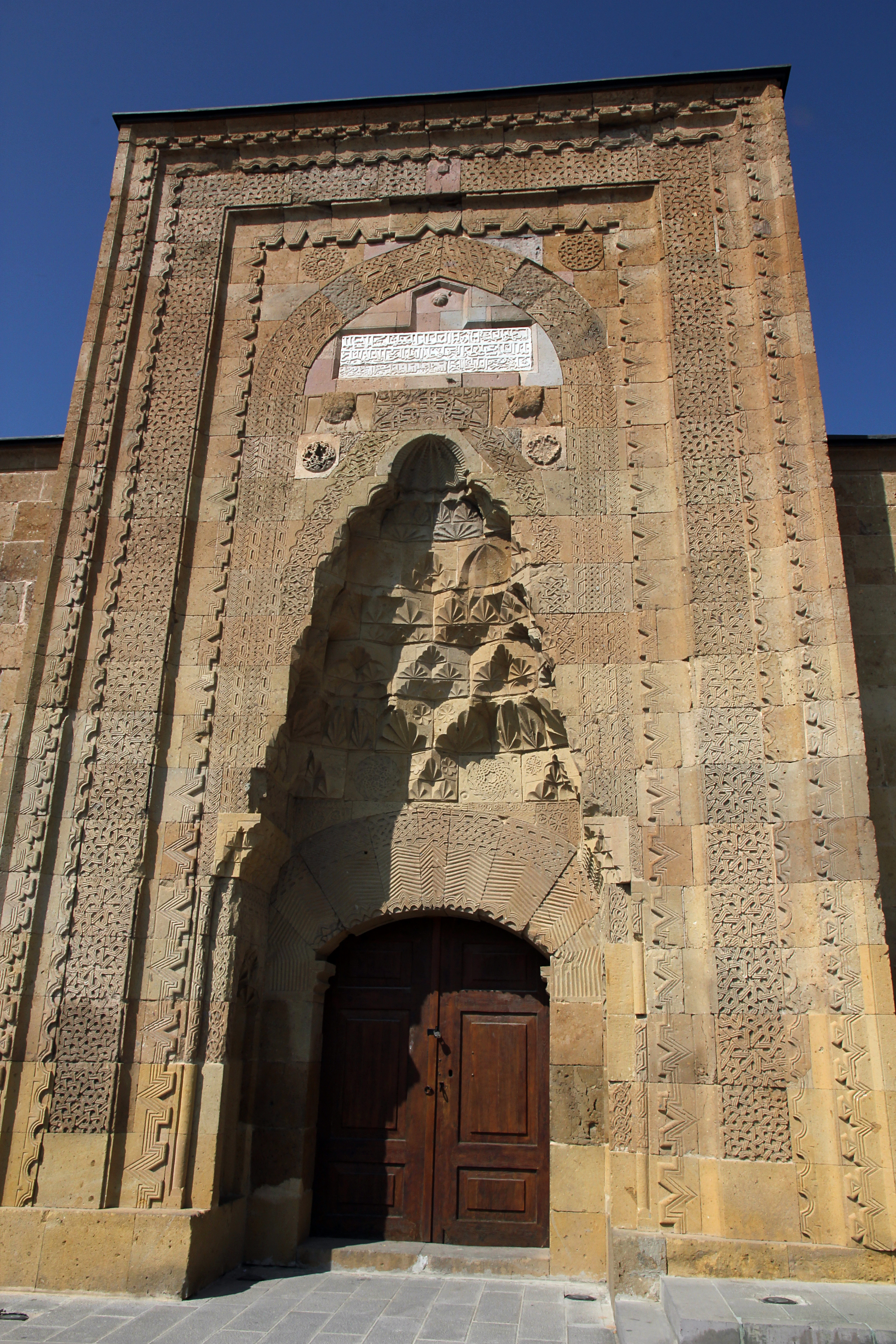
Entrance portal of the Alaeddin Mosque in Niğde, Turkey (1223, Anatolian Seljuk period)

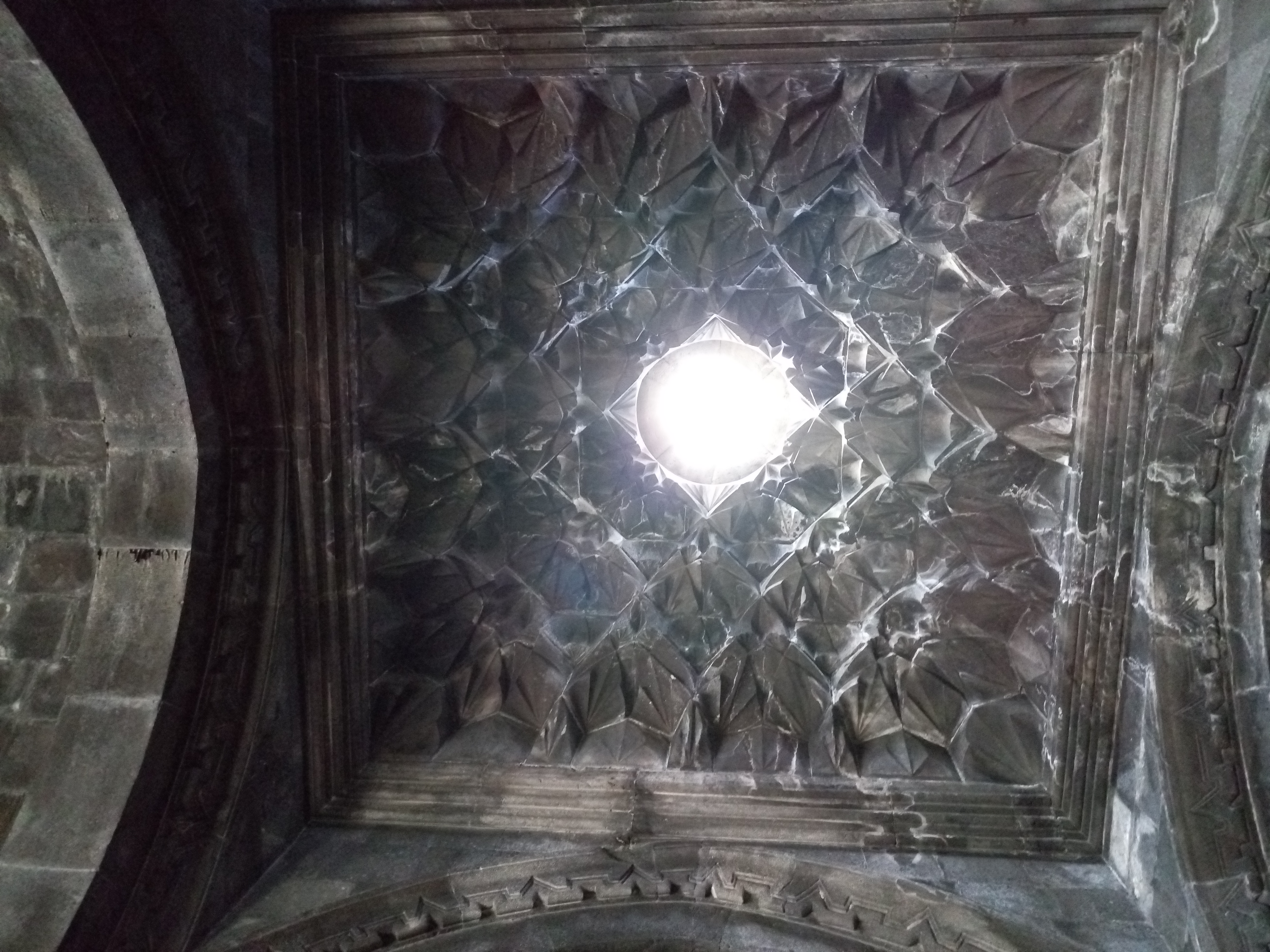
Muqarnas vault with central oculus in the gavit of the Geghard Monastery in Armenia (13th century, before 1225)

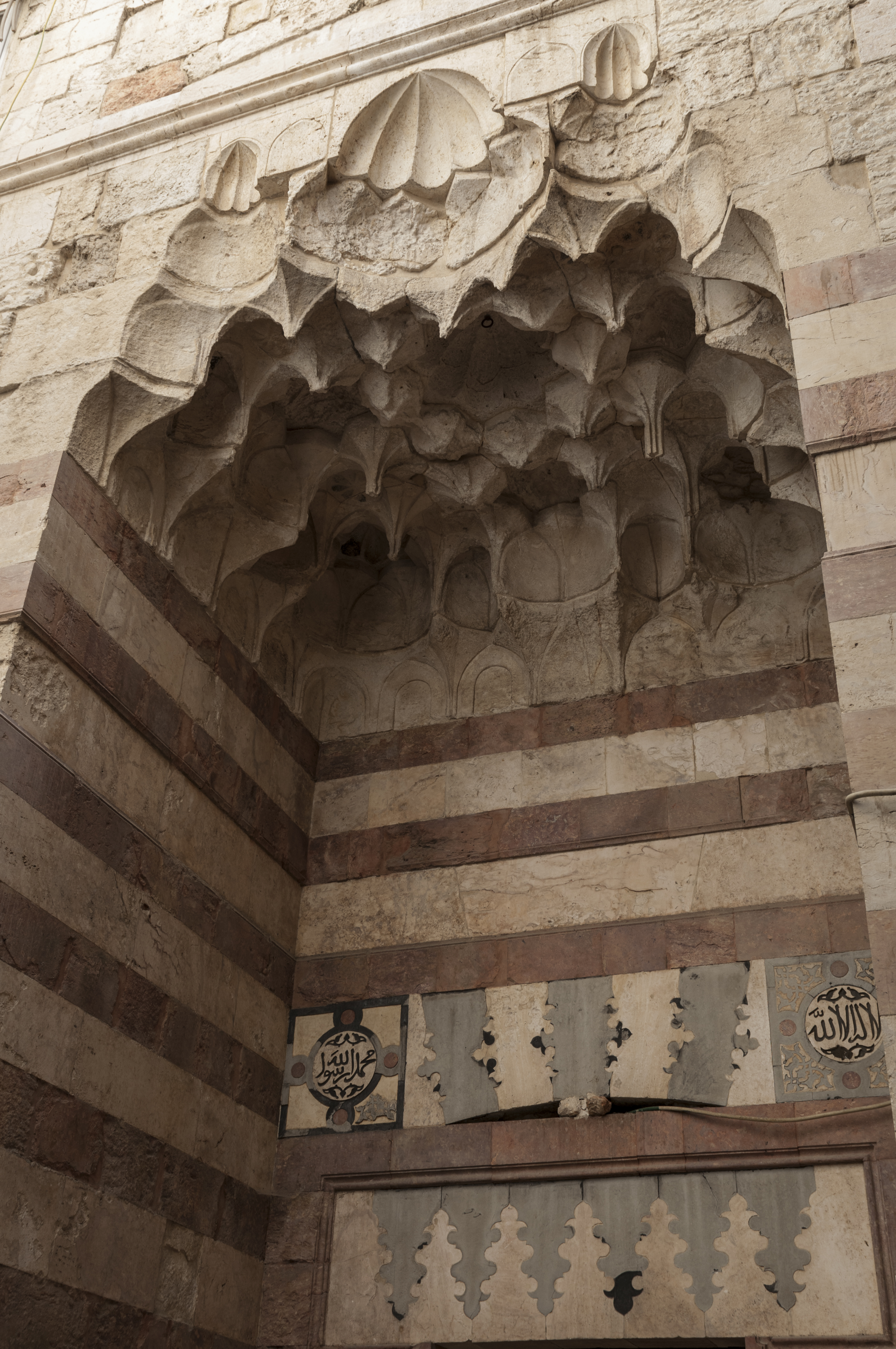
A flat muqarnas vault in the portal of the Madrasa as-Sallamiya in Jerusalem (1338, Mamluk period)

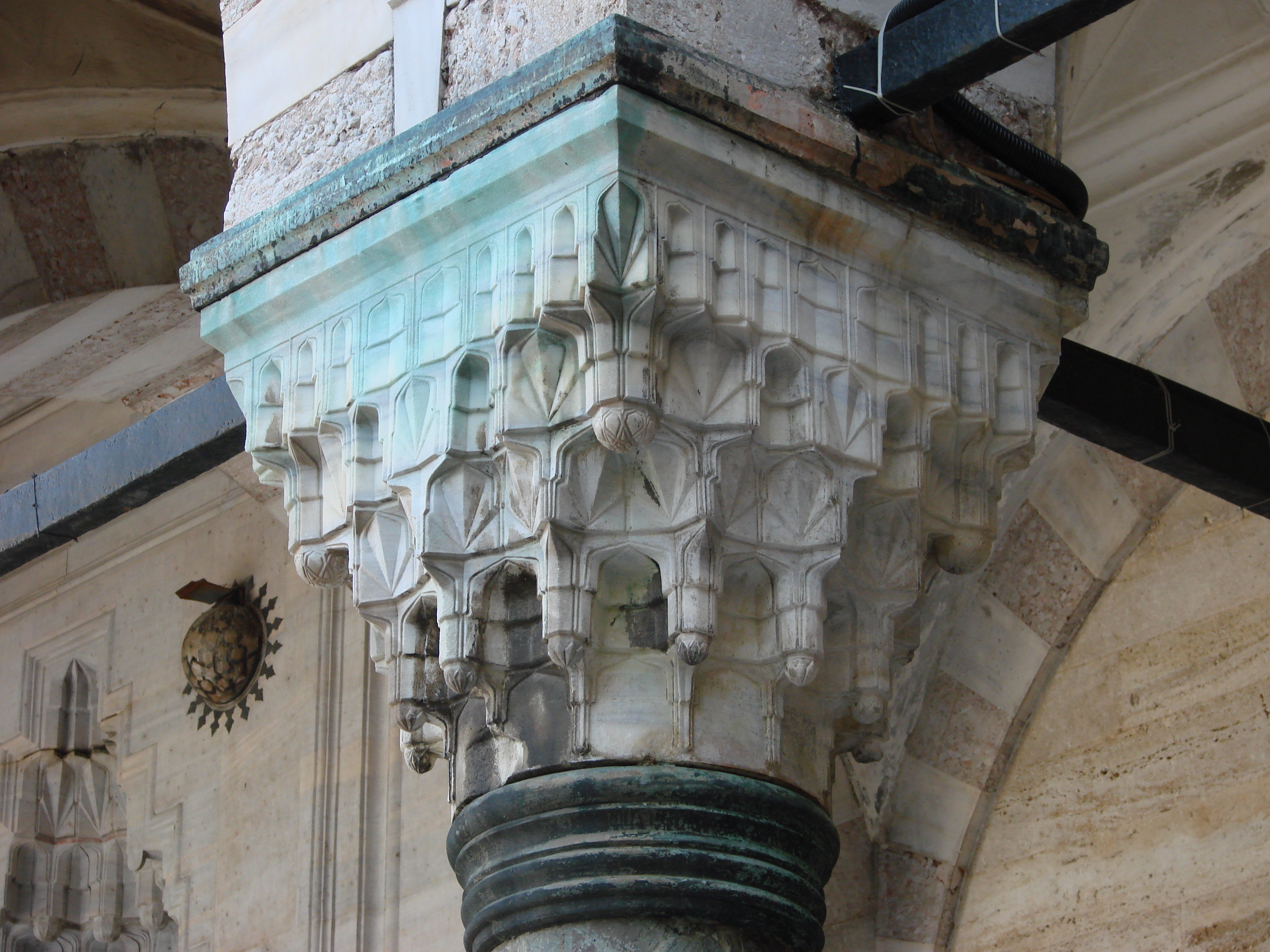
Muqarnas capital inside the courtyard of the Bayezid II Mosque in Istanbul (1500–1505), Ottoman period

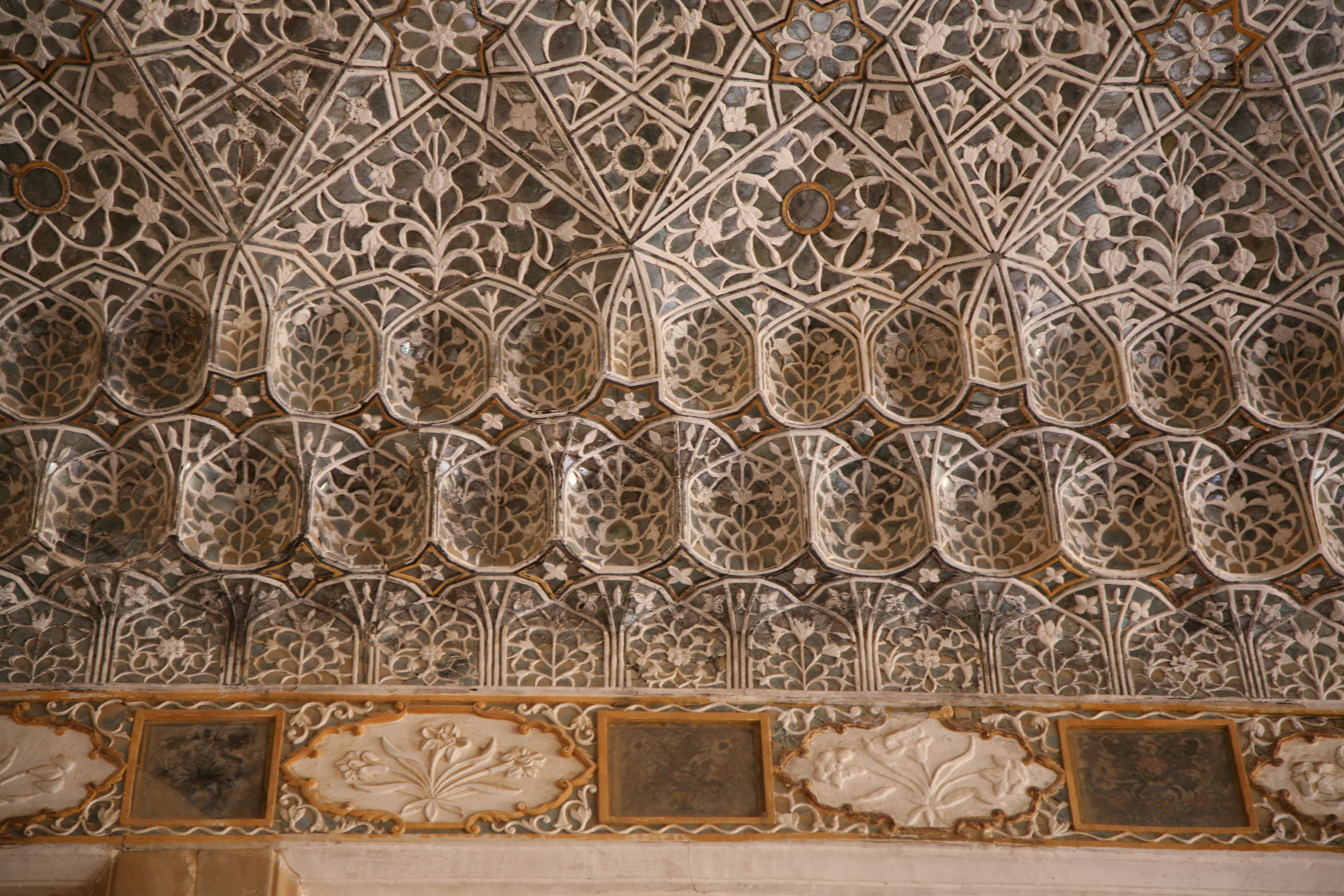
Muqarnas cornice inside the Sheesh Mahal (Hall of Mirrors) in the Amber Fort in Amer (17th century)

Muqarnas vaults over the Amin al-Dawla Caravanserai (19th century) inside the Kashan Bazaar, Iran

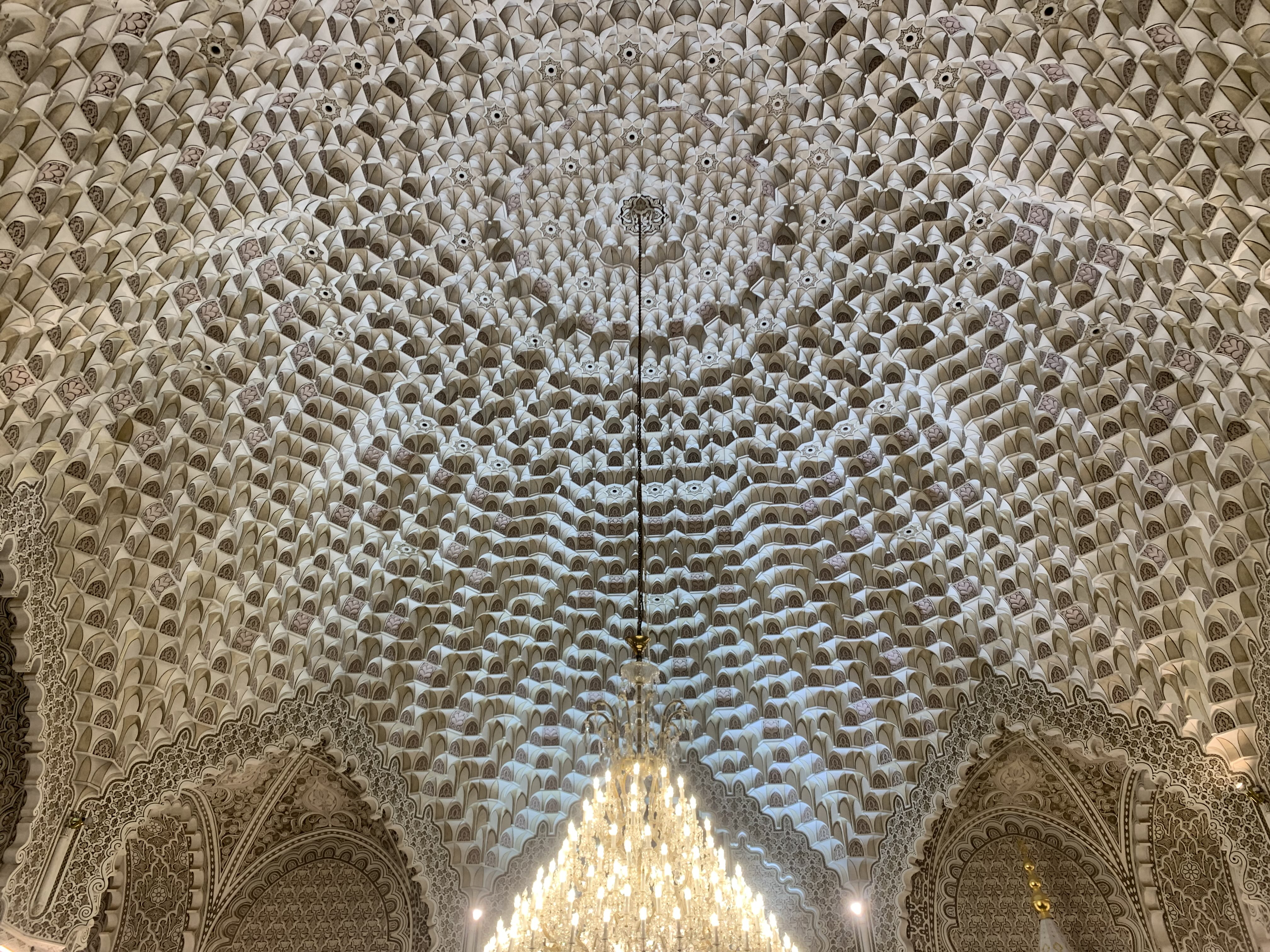
Modern-day muqarnas vault inside the main prayer hall of the Abu Hanifa Mosque in Baghdad

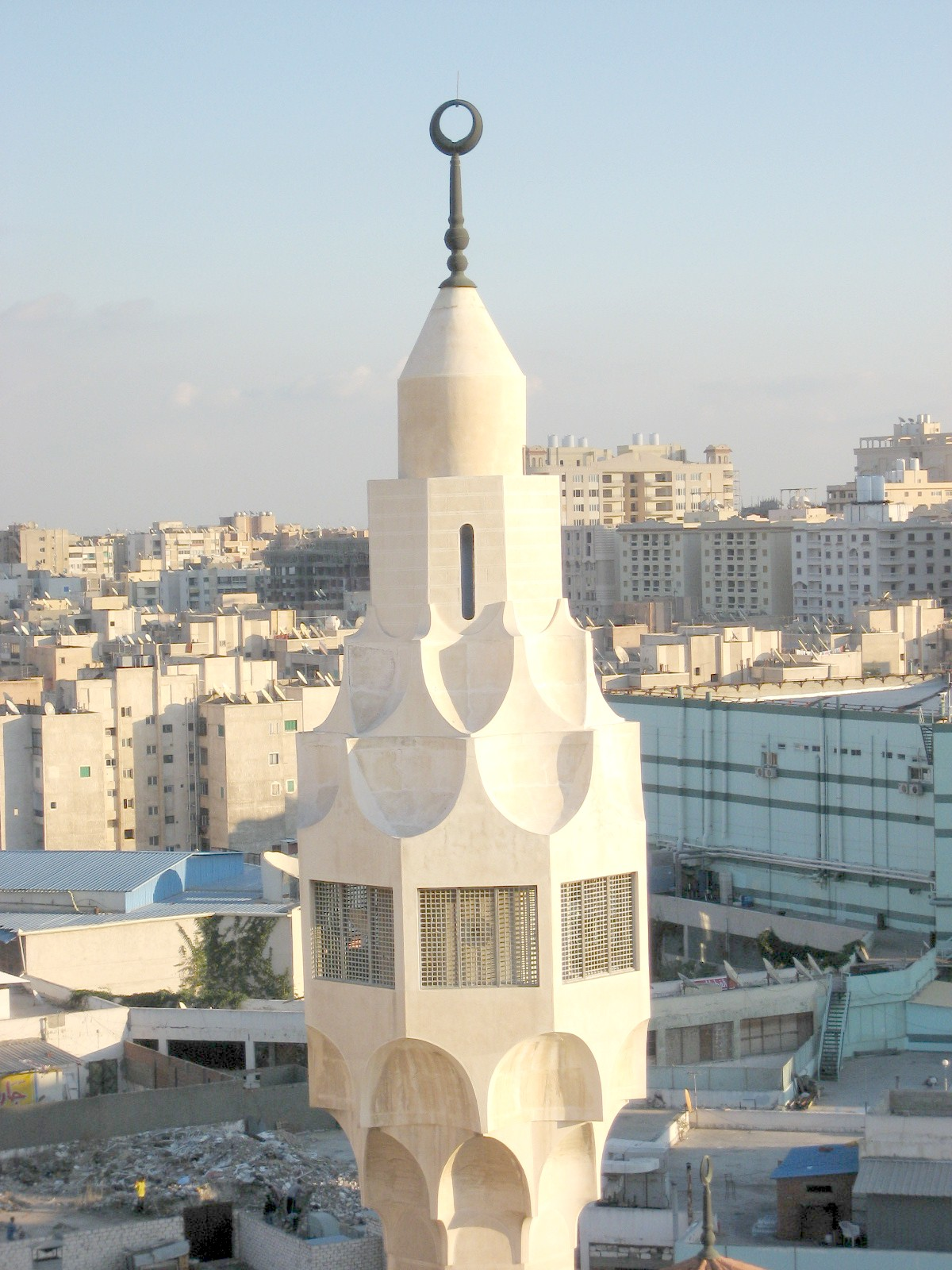
Upward- and downward-facing muqarnas on the minaret of the Hatem Mosque in Alexandria

== See also ==
- Islamic geometric patterns – Geometric pattern characteristic of Muslim art
- Mathematics and art
- Symbolism of domes
