= Davāzdah Imām =

Mausoleum in Iran

Mausoleum of Davāzdah Imām دوازده امام
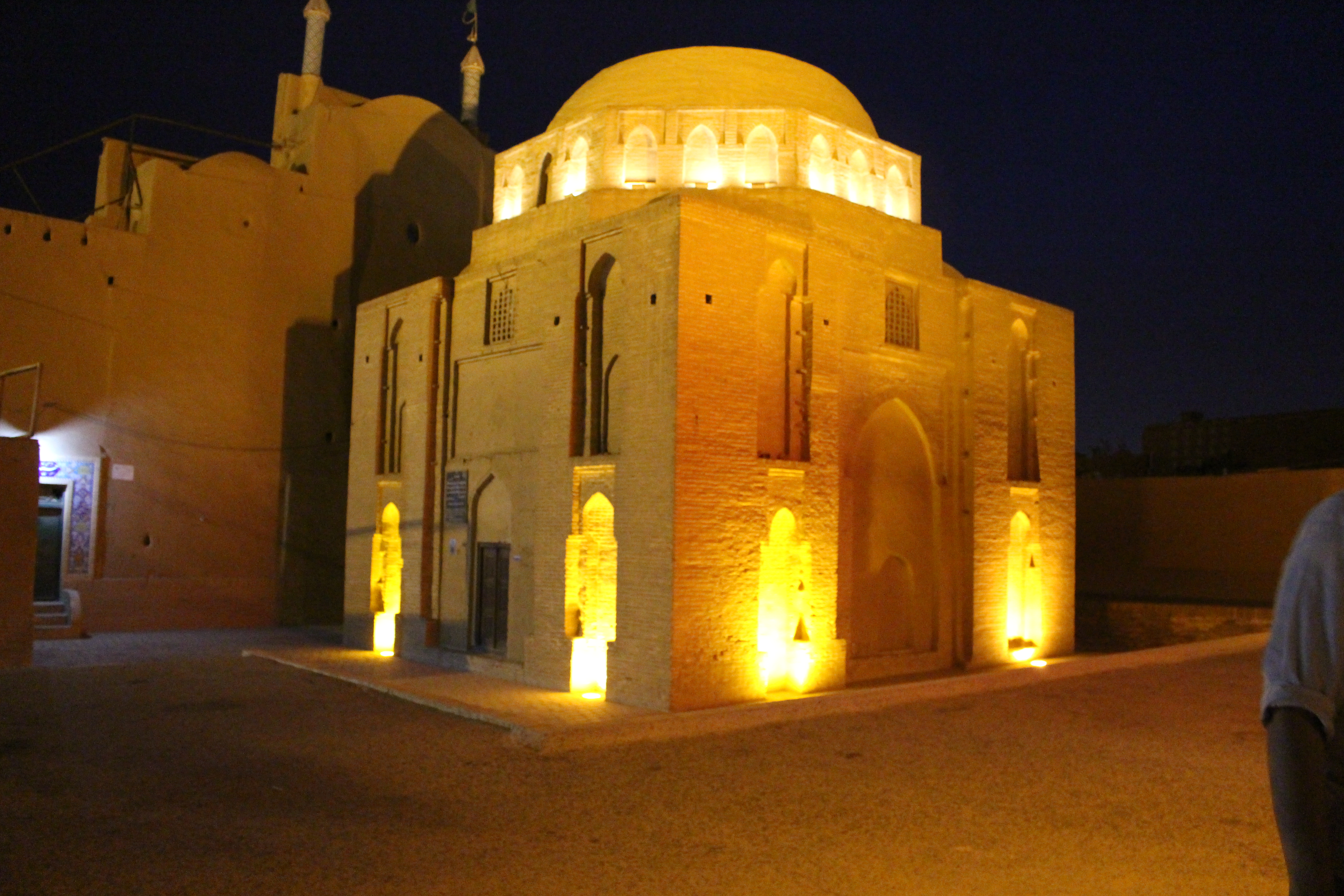

- Location within Iran
- 31°54′17.6″N 54°22′12.2″E
- Location: Yazd, Iran

Iran National Heritage List
- Official name: Mausoleum of Davazdah Imam
- Type: Mausoleum
- Designated: 1934
- Reference no.: 207
- Conservation organization: Cultural Heritage, Handicrafts and Tourism Organization of Iran

Davāzdah Imām, also known as The Mausoleum of the Twelve Imams, is an 11th-century mausoleum and ziyarat (shrine) in the Fahadan quarter of Yazd, Iran. It is the earliest-dated building in Yazd. It is adjacent to Zendan-e Eskandar (Alexander's Prison). The building is made of brick, and the inside bears inscriptions of the names of The Twelve Imams (who are not, despite its name, buried in the mausoleum).
