= List of palaces in Egypt =

This is a list of existing and former palaces in Egypt across all periods, including time of the Pharaohs, the Romans, Fatimids, Mamluks, and the modern Egyptian kingdom.

== Egyptian palaces ==
Era	Date	Palace	Location	Notes
Pharonic	16th century BC	Palace of an unknown king	Ballas	
Pharonic	14th century BC	Palace of Amenhotep III	Malkata (or Malqata), Luxor	
Pharonic	1346 BC	Amarna palaces of the Pharaoh Akhenaten	al-Minya	
Pharonic	14th century BC	Amenhotep III palace	Avaris (Pi-Ramesses) in the Eastern Desert	
Pharonic	13th century BC	Palace of the Pharaoh Merenptah	Memphis, Egypt	
Pharonic	13th century BC	Palace of Rameses II	Ramesseum, Luxor	
Pharonic	13th century BC	Palace of Rameses II	Fayoum	
Pharonic	1175 BC	The temple and palace of Rameses III	Medinet Habu	
Pharonic	6th century BC	Palace of Wahibre (Apries)	Memphis, Egypt	
Ptolemaic	Circa 3rd century BC - 1st century BC	Palaces in the Royal Quarter of Alexandria	South of Cape Lochias	
Ptolemaic	50s BC	Antirhodos island palace	Off Alexandria's mainland in the Eastern Harbour	Later on was submerged by sea
Roman	100 AD	Roman palace at El Haiz	Bahariya Oasis, Western Desert	
Islamic	870 AD	Ahmad ibn Tulun Palace	al-Qatta'i, Old Cairo	
Islamic	12th century	Fatimid Great Palaces (the Great Eastern Palace and the Western Palace)	Bayn al-Qasrayn area, Historic Cairo	
Islamic	12th century	Cairo Citadel	Cairo	
Islamic	13th century	Sultan al-Salih palace	Rhoda Island, Cairo	
Islamic	1293	Amir Alin Aq Palace or Amir Khayrbak Palace	Bab al-Wazir Street, Tabbana Quarter, al-Darb al-Ahmar	
Islamic	14th century	Ablaq Palace of Al-Nasir Muhammad	Cairo Citadel	
Islamic	14th century	Palace of Manjak al Yusufi al Silahdar	Cairo	
Islamic	1330	Amir Qawsun Palace (Qawsoun Yashbak min Mahdi)	Cairo	
Islamic	1334	Beshtak Palace	Cairo	
Islamic	1352	Amir Taz Palace	Cairo	
Islamic	1366	Palace of Emir Tashtimur (Hummus Akhdar)	Cairo	
Islamic	15th century	Ghuri Palace		
Islamic	1496	Amir Mamay Palace (Bait al-Qady)		
Islamic	16th century	Bayt Al-Razzaz palace or Palace of al-Ashraf Qaytbay	al-Darb al-Ahmar	
Islamic	1634	House of Gamal al-Din al-Dhahabi, Al-Ghoureya		
Islamic	18th century	Kasr Alaini	Cairo	Became a Cairo University hospital building
Islamic	1731	Harawi Residence		
Islamic	1779	Al Musafir Khana Palace (Kasr El Chok) The birthplace of Khedive Ismail, it was destroyed by fire in 1998.	al-Jamaliyya, Old Cairo	The birthplace of Khedive Ismail. Destroyed by fire in 1998.
Islamic	1790s	Mohammed Bey al-Alfi Palace		Napoleon lived here during his Egyptian campaign
Islamic	1794	Bayt al-Sinnari Palace		Now a museum
Modern Egypt	19th century	Bulaq palace of Ismail Pasha	Giza	
Modern Egypt	19th century	Mena House	Giza	Built by Khedive Ismail
Modern Egypt	19th century	Kasr al-Nozha, Cattaui (Egyptian Jewish industrialist) palace	Shubra	
Modern Egypt	19th century	Kasr al-Incha		Now the ministry of defense
Modern Egypt	19th century	Kasr Kamal al-Din		Former residence of the ministry of foreign affairs
Modern Egypt	19th century	Zaafarana palace (now part of Ain Shams University)		
Modern Egypt	19th century	Medhat Yegen Pasha's palace	Cairo	Demolished
Modern Egypt	19th century	Mahmoud Sami el-Baroudi palace	Giza	Demolished
Modern Egypt	19th century	Kasr al-Aali		
Modern Egypt	19th century	Kasr al-Mounira		Now French Archeological Centre (IFAO)
Modern Egypt	19th century	Kasr al-Amira Iffet Hassan		Purchased by Princess Shuvekar Ibrahim before becoming the official seat of the council of ministers
Modern Egypt	19th century	El-Walda Pasha palace		Demolished
Modern Egypt	19th century	Montaza Palace	Alexandria	
Modern Egypt	1807	Muhammad Ali's Shubra Palace		Now Ain Shams faculty of agriculture
Modern Egypt	1827	Harem Palaces at the Citadel of Cairo (now the Military museum)	Cairo	Now a military museum
Modern Egypt	1850s	Kasr al-Ismailia, Mogama El-Tahrir government complex		Demolished
Modern Egypt	1860s	Khairy Pasha palace		
Modern Egypt	1814	Al-Gawhara Palace	Cairo	
Modern Egypt	1834	Ras Al-Teen Palace	Alexandria	
Modern Egypt	1854	Kasr al-Nil	Cairo	Now demolished but the area in downtown Cairo still carries its name
Modern Egypt	1863	Gezirah Palace		Now a hotel
Modern Egypt	1863	Abdeen Palace	Cairo	Former royal residence
Modern Egypt	1897	Count Gabriel Habib El-Sakakini Pasha Palace	Old Cairo	
Modern Egypt	1898	Anisa Wissa Palace	Fayoum	
Modern Egypt	1899	Prince Mohammed Ali Tewfik palace		Now Manyal Palace museum
Modern Egypt	1899	Prince Said Halim Pasha Palace	Cairo	
Modern Egypt	Late 19th century	Koubbeh Palace	El-Quba	
Modern Egypt	20th century	Fouad Serageddin Pasha's palace	Garden City	
Modern Egypt	20th century	EL-Dobara palace		Now a government school
Modern Egypt	20th century	Tahra palace	El-Zayton	
Modern Egypt	1901	The Palace of Saad Zaghloul Pasha		Now Beit El-Omma Museum
Modern Egypt	1908	Prince Youssef Kamal Palace	Nag Hammadi	
Modern Egypt	1911	Baron Empain palace		
Modern Egypt	1910	Heliopolis Palace	Heliopolis, Cairo	
Modern Egypt	1915	Mohammed Mahmoud Khalil palace		Now a museum
Modern Egypt	1919	Princess Fatma Al-Zahra' Palace	Alexandria	Now Royal Jewelery Museum
Modern Egypt	1920s	Prince Amr Ibrahim Palace	Zamalek	Now the Museum of Islamic Ceramics
Modern Egypt	1924	Kurmet Ibn Hani'		Now Ahmed Shawqi museum

== Others ==
- Qaroun Palace (Qasr Qaroun) is a Ptolemaic temple in Fayoum.
- Hatshepsut's Palace is Deir el-Bahri Hatshepsut's temple.

== See also ==
- List of palaces
