= Madrasa of Umm al-Sultan Sha'ban =

Islamic school and funerary complex in Cairo, Egypt

- مدرسة أم السلطان شعبان
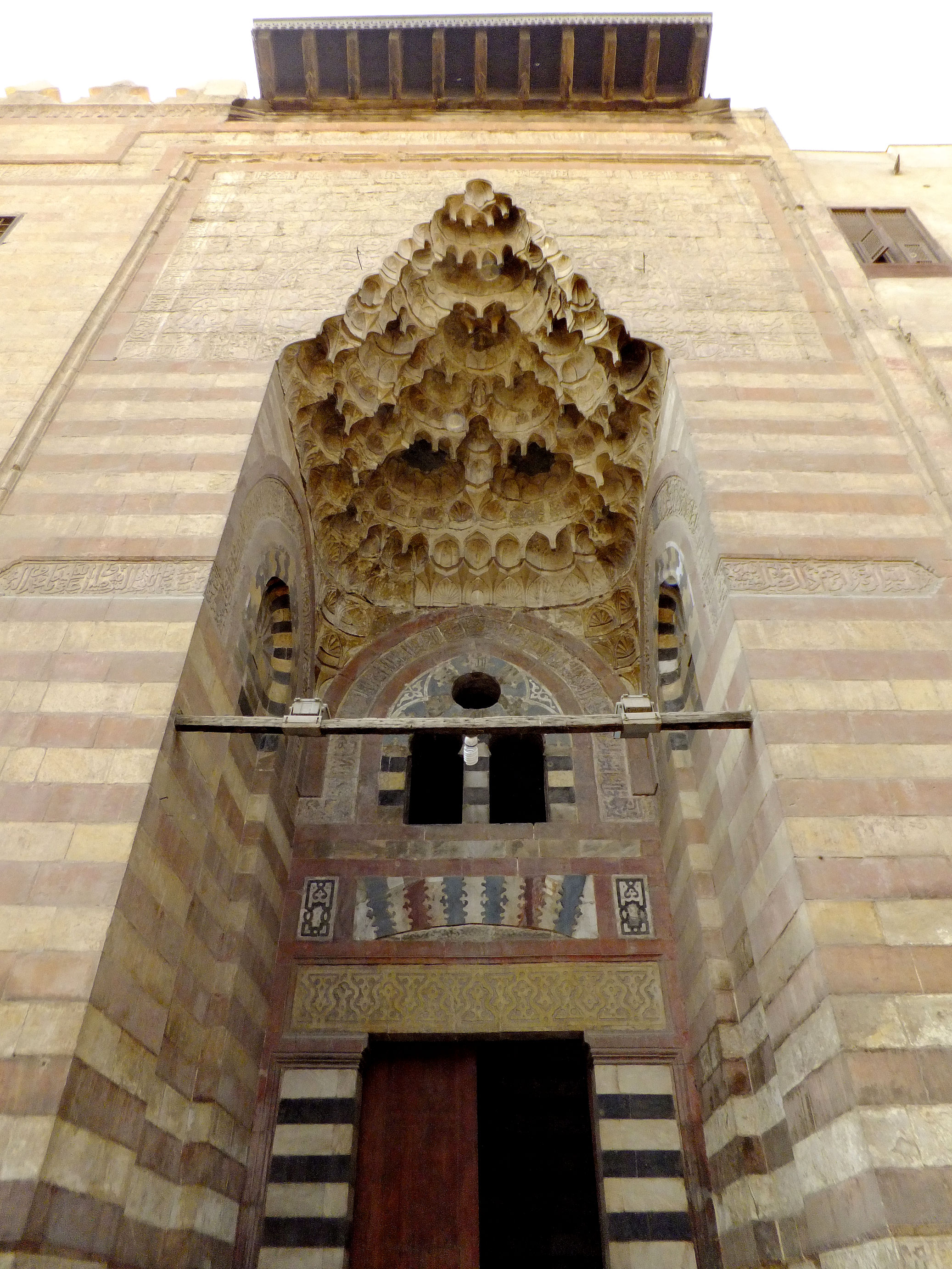
- Entrance iwan of the madrasa

Religion
- Affiliation: Islam
- Ecclesiastical or organisational status: Madrasa; Mausoleum
- Status: Active

Location
- Location: Al-Darb al-Ahmar, Islamic Cairo
- Country: Egypt
- Interactive map of Madrasa of Umm al-Sultan Sha'ban
- Coordinates: 30°02′14″N 31°15′34″E

Architecture
- Type: Madrasa
- Style: Mamluk; Islamic
- Founder: Sultan al-Ashraf Sha'ban
- Completed: 770 AH (1368/1369 CE)

Specifications
- Dome: 2
- Minaret: 1
- Materials: Stone; wood

The Madrasa of Umm al-Sultan Sha'ban (Arabic: مدرسة أم السلطان شعبان, romanized: Madrasa Umm al-Sulṭān Shaʿbān) is an Islamic madrasa, mausoleum, and mosque complex, located in the Al-Darb al-Ahmar area of Islamic Cairo, Egypt. The complex was completed in 770 AH (1368/1369 CE) during the Mamluk-era on the order of Sultan al-Ashraf Sha'ban in honour of his mother, Khawand Baraka (also referred to as Umm al-Sultan Sha'ban). It is located outside Bab Zuweila along al-Tabbana street, and is adjoined to the north by the Bayt al-Razzaz palace. In addition to the madrasa, mausoleum, and mosque, the complex includes a hawd (water trough), and a maktab (primary school).

== History ==
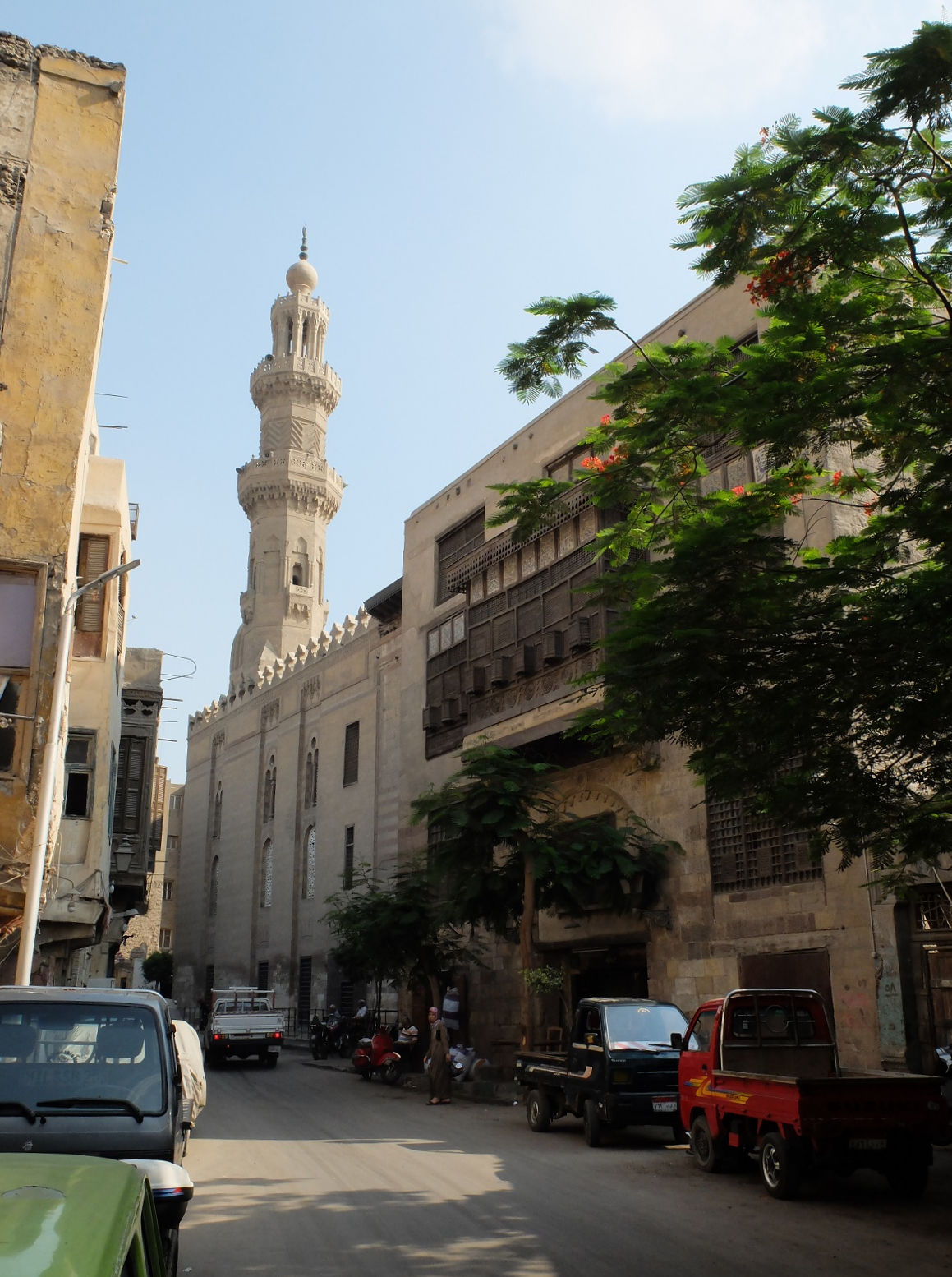
The historic Darb al-Ahmar street (also called here Bab al-Wazir Street) in front of the madrasa, with the minaret visible. The adjacent Bayt al-Razzaz Palace (right) is also visible.

Al-Ashraf Sha'ban (r. 1363–1377) was a grandson of al-Nasir Muhammad and was 10 years old when he came to the throne. His mother, Khawand Baraka, was one of the most notable powerful women in Egypt at this time. She was concubine then wife to Husayn (Sha'ban's father), a son of Sultan al-Nasir Muhammad, who never rose to the throne. When Husayn died in 1362, she married the amir Uljay al-Yusufi (who built his own madrasa in the nearby Suq al-Silah street). She grew more influential and well known when Sha'ban came to the throne as a child.

Sha'ban commissioned the madrasa and mausoleum in 770 AH (1368/1369 CE), reportedly to honour his mother who was on pilgrimage (hajj) to Mecca at the time. However, given that he was aged 15 years at the time, there is a fair chance that the decision to build the madrasa was in accordance with his mother's own wishes, especially as there are few other examples of such impressive monuments being built for the female relatives of Mamluk sultans. The site of the madrasa was reportedly once a cemetery for the people of Cairo. Khawand returned to Cairo the next year (in 1369–70) and endowed the madrasa and its mosque. She died in 1373 and was buried in the larger of the two mausoleums attached to her madrasa.

In 1375 Sha'ban founded and embarked on the construction of his own ambitious mosque, madrasa, and mausoleum complex, on the location of what is now the Maristan of al-Mu'ayyad, at the northwestern foot of the Citadel. It was lavishly decorated and, like his mother's madrasa, it had two domes (probably inspired by the double-domed mausoleums to the south of the Citadel, such as the Sultaniyya Mausoleum). However, Sha'ban was assassinated in 1377, before his mausoleum complex was finished and ready for use. He ended up instead being buried in the smaller mausoleum of his mother's madrasa. The complex he had begun to build was eventually dismantled by Sultan Faraj ibn Barquq in 1411 in order to reuse its materials for a number of other buildings including the so-called Zawiya of Faraj ibn Barquq, located in front of Bab Zuweila, and the madrasa-mosque of his emir Jamal al-Din Ustadar.

Once completed, the madrasa taught Islamic law in the Hanafi and Shafi'i madhhabs. Some excellent illuminated manuscripts of the Qur'an date from Sha'ban's reign and it is believed that this madrasa may have contained a workshop for producing them. The Museum of Islamic Art in Cairo also has other well-crafted artifacts that come from this madrasa.

In the late 15th century, Sultan Qaytbay built a palace or mansion adjacent to the madrasa. In the 19th century, the palace was merged with another adjacent mansion built in 1776 by Ahmad al-Razzaz. The building is now known as Bayt al-Razzaz, and today its façade is contiguous with the façade of the madrasa of Sha'ban.

Starting in 2000, the building was restored by the Aga Khan Trust for Culture.

== Endowment ==
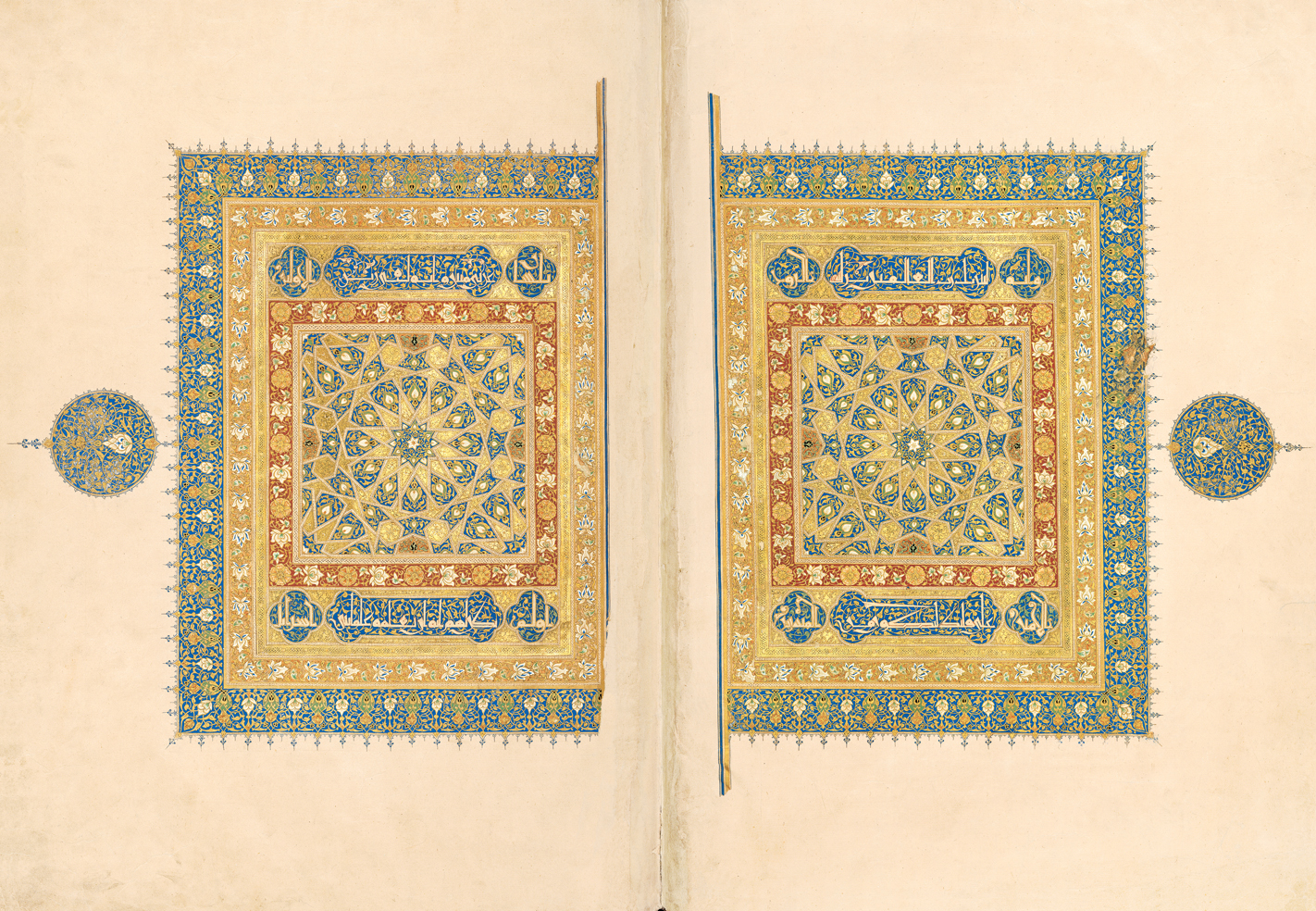
Frontispiece from the Qur'an bequeathed by Khawand Baraka to her madrasa. This manuscript is part of the National Library of Egypt's Collection of Mamluk Qur'an Manuscripts inscribed in the UNESCO Memory of the World Register

The complex was funded through a waqf (endowment) and the waqfiyya (endowment deed) for this institution has partially survived with the early part of the scroll missing. The waqfiyya recorded urban rental properties and agricultural properties in Syria and Egypt. The urban rental properties in Cairo included a qaysāriyya (commercial building) and a rabʿ (apartment building) in Cairo. The waqfiyya also recorded agrarian property in the province of Aleppo (Syria) in addition to the urban properties. According to Ibn al-Ji'an, there were two Egyptian properties tied to the madrasa's endowment and its founder, Khawand Baraka. The first was the district of Saft Abi Turab in the province of al-Gharbiyya was endowed for the Madrasa of Umm al-Sultan Sha'ban. This was a large district with a fiscal value (ʿibra) of 20,000 dinars jayshi per year and was one of the wealthiest agrarian properties endowed during the Bahri Mamluk period as recorded in Ibn al-Ji'an's recension of Mamluk cadastral records. Another district, Taqadus in the province of al-Sharqiyya was part of Khawand Baraka's endowment.

== Architecture ==
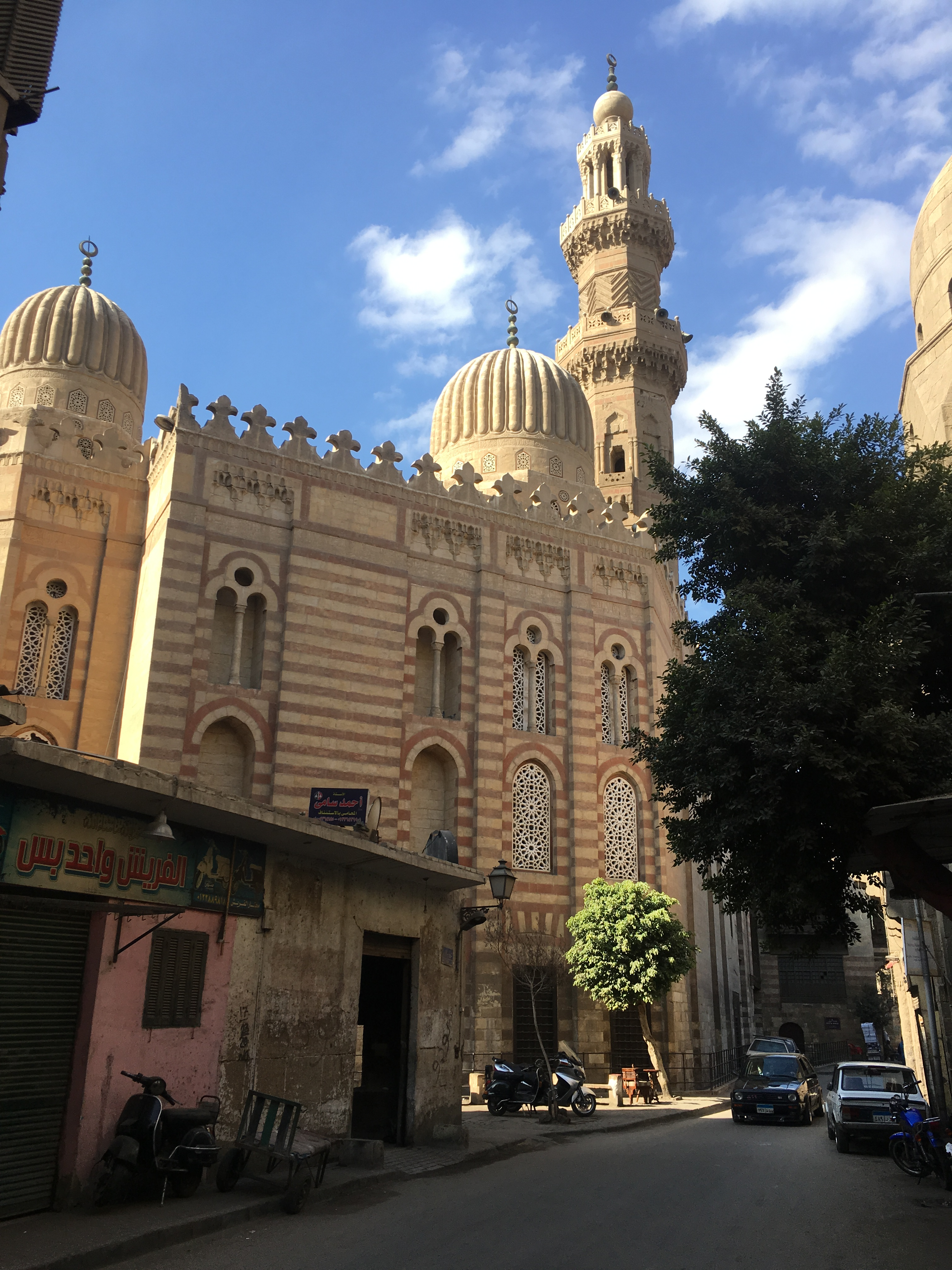
The madrasa, its domes, and its minaret, seen from the south.

The overall plan of the building is arranged around a central courtyard and two mausoleum chambers with domes.

=== Exterior ===
The layout of the complex is somewhat unusual due to its unusual site at the corner of the main street (Tabbana street, the continuation of al-Darb al-Ahmar street) and a minor side street joining it at an angle. The floor plan of the complex deals with this by forming a three-sided façade around this corner. The monumental main entrance is at the northern end of the eastern façade, but a small side entrance to the madrasa existed on the western side. The complex has two domes corresponding to the two mausoleum chambers inside. The minaret and the larger mausoleum dome (which belonged to Khawand's mausoleum) stand together at the southwestern corner, right where the two streets join, thus maximizing their visibility. The exterior of the two domes is ribbed or fluted, like other Mamluk domes of the period (e.g. the Sultaniyya Mausoleum or the nearby Madrasa of Uljay al-Yusufi). Around the drums of the domes are inscriptions in Arabic. Originally, the letters of the inscription were gilded against a green background. The top of the octagonal minaret collapsed or was destroyed in recent centuries, but has been reconstructed (based on photographs of the old one) in the most recent restoration completed in 2007. The exterior walls of the building are tall and imposing (around 18 meters high). The triple windows near its upper parts are partly decorative, seeing as some of the windows (on the left, overlapping with the eastern iwan inside) are blind (i.e. blocked) and don't serve to allow light in.

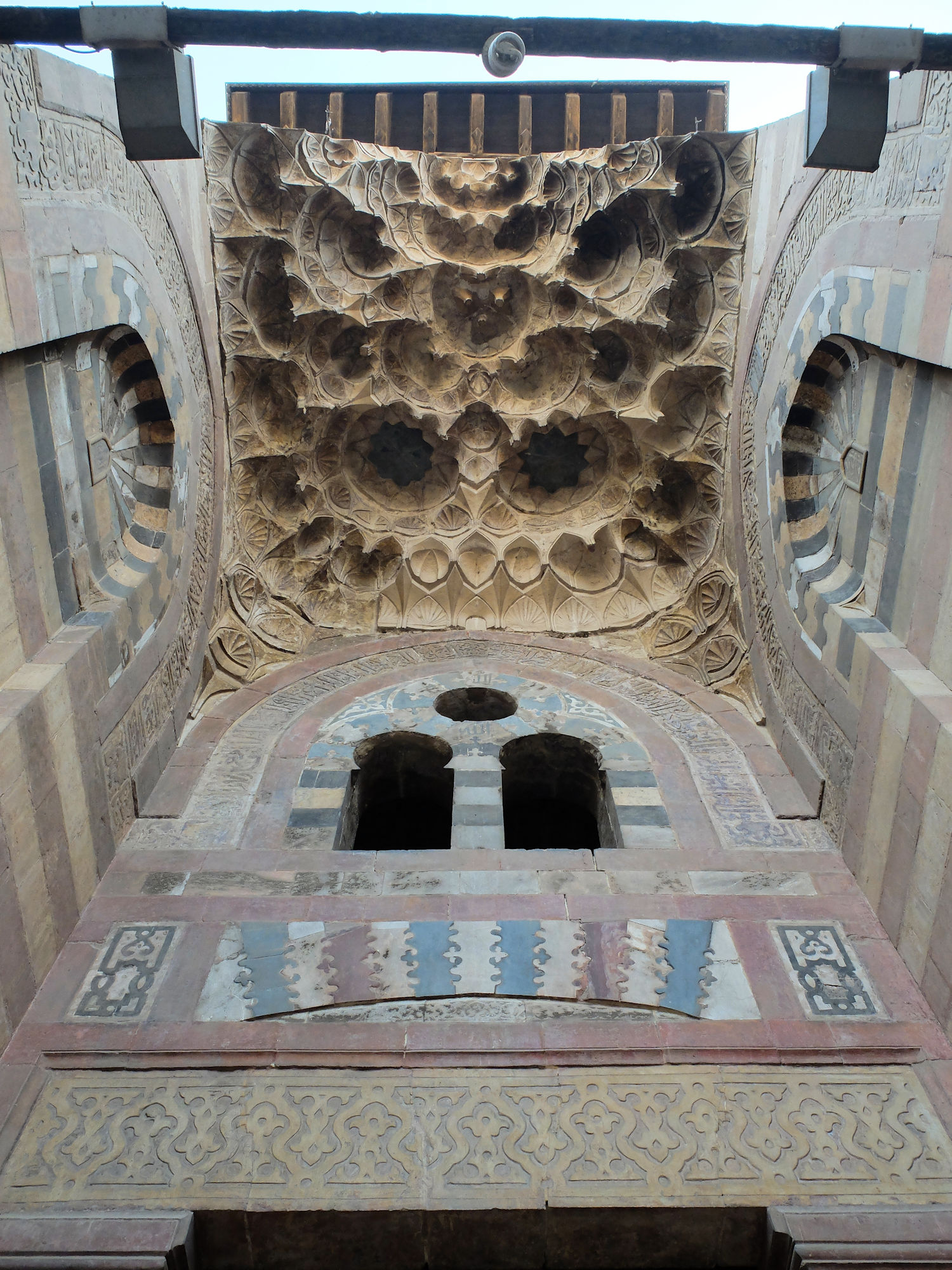
The decoration of the entrance portal.

==== Entrance portal ====
The entrance portal is one of the building's most remarkable features. Like many Mamluk buildings, the entrance is set in a recess within the exterior walls, the top of which is crowned with a muqarnas (stalactite or honeycomb-like carvings). The muqarnas canopy here is more or less pyramid-shaped like the entrance portal of Seljuk/Mongol buildings in Muslim Anatolia at the time, possibly of the same inspiration as the portal of Sultan Hassan's massive madrasa-mosque, built just over a decade earlier. Nonetheless, the overall decorative design is Mamluk and features heavy use of multi-colored stone and marble. Right below the muqarnas hood is a triple window (smaller but of similar shape as the other triple windows on the building's exterior) flanked on either side by shallow decorative niches in the shape of pointed arches, all featuring multi-colored stone. There are also several inscriptions in Arabic, both carved and inlaid, of one word or of whole passages, around the portal. One inscription wraps around two arch-shaped decorative niches on the sides and around a triple window in the middle, winding its way up and down from one side of the portal to the other. Smaller one-word inscriptions include the word Allah inlaid around the triple window, and small black-and-white inscriptions at the center of the decorative niches on either side. The triangular muqarnas hood at the top of the portal is also framed by an outer rectangular frame filled with carved arabesques, albeit relatively faded.

==== Sabil and trough ====
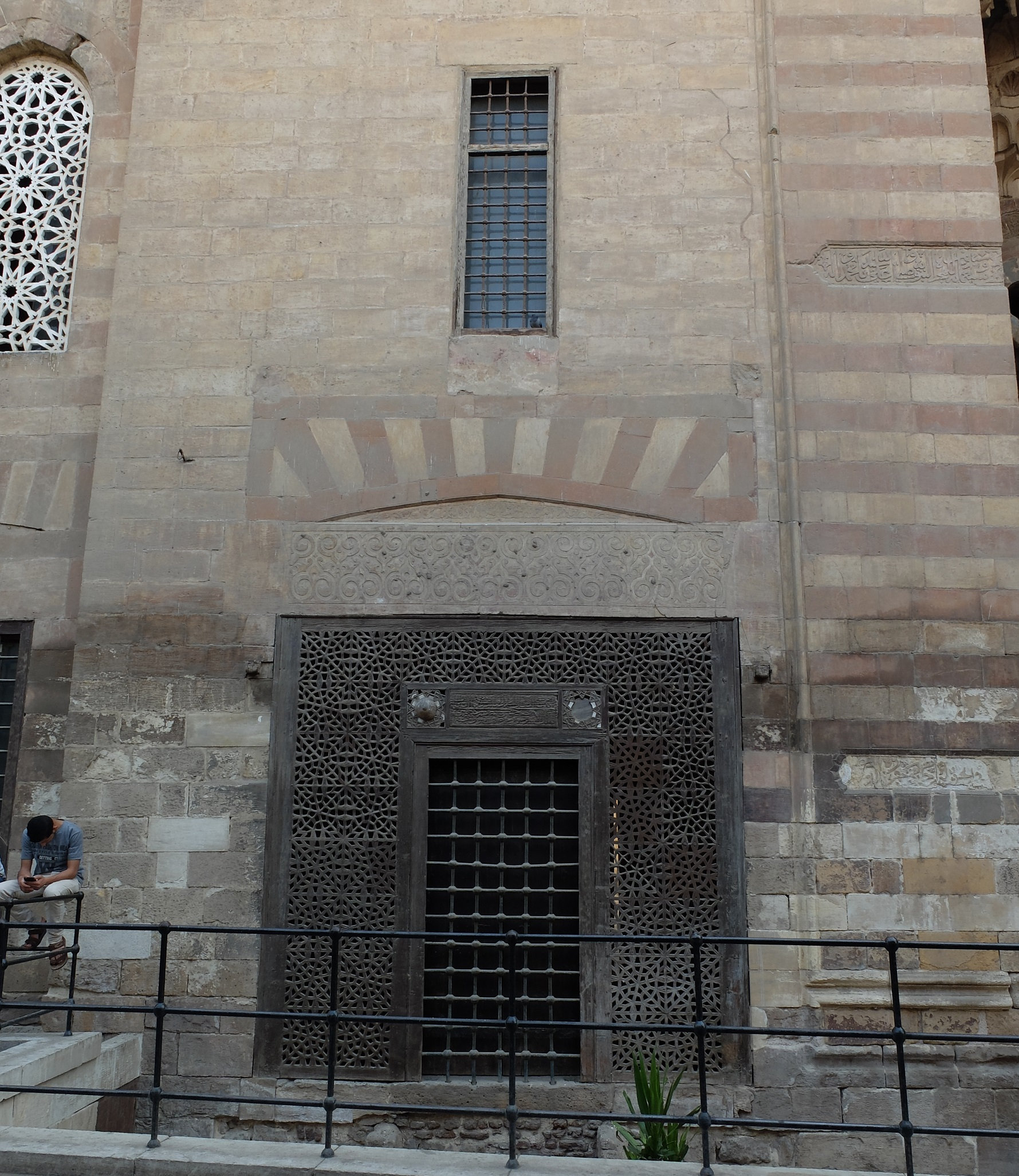
The sabil next to the entrance portal.

Two other minor features existed on either side of the portal. On the left is a delicately carved wooden screen which is part of the sabil, a kiosk that dispensed water freely. On the right was a drinking trough (Arabic: hawd) for animals, above which is a carved inscription band with the epigraphic blazon or cartouche of Sultan Sha'ban.

=== Interior ===
The entrance portal leads to a long stone-vaulted passage with the madrasa and its central courtyard on the left and some annexes on the right. These annex rooms are part of a series of rooms located within the outer parts of the complex, wrapped around the madrasa courtyard and distributed along three stories. These included service rooms for staff and living quarters for the students.

The rectangular main courtyard of the madrasa is surrounded by iwans on four sides in a cruciform configuration. The iwans along the qibla axis (i.e. aligned with the direction of prayer) are larger than the transverse iwans. A monumental inscription runs along the top of the courtyard's walls, above the openings of the iwans, and features a verse of the Qur'an (3:190-192, from the Surah Ali 'Imran). The iwans had richly painted and gilded wooden ceilings, with the ceiling of the southern iwan being well-preserved and restored today. The southeastern iwan is the qibla iwan (the one pointing in the direction of prayer) and features a mihrab which, along with the surrounding wall, is decorated in multi-coloured marble.

The qibla iwan is flanked on either side by the two mausoleum chambers, accessed from the sides of the courtyard. The smaller mausoleum, on the right (to the south) has no mihrab, while the larger mausoleum, on the left (to the north) has a mihrab flanked by two windows. The larger mausoleum contains the tomb of Khawand Baraka (Umm al-Sultan Sha'ban) and a daughter of Sha'ban, while the smaller museum ended up being the tomb of Sultan Sha'ban himself (when his other mausoleum complex was unfinished upon his death) and one of his sons al-Mansur Hajji. Both mausoleum domes have simple round squinches in the transition zone between the square chamber and the round base of the dome above rather than the more typical muqarnas-sculpted pendentives found in Mamluk architecture. The squinches nonetheless have some decoration by using two-coloured masonry with a radiating motif. Other than this, the mausoleums are unadorned.

A doorway off the larger mausoleum leads to an irregularly shaped room sandwiched between other chambers in the floor plan. The room has a richly decorated ceiling (similar to the painted and gilded wooden ceilings of the courtyard iwans). It is thought that this room may have been used as a workshop to create Qur'an manuscripts, and/or as place to store them.

== See also ==
- Islam in Egypt
- List of mosques in Cairo
- List of madrasas in Egypt
- List of mausoleums in Egypt
- Late medieval domes
