= The Large Walnut Tree, Autumn Morning, Éragny =

Painting by Camille Pissarro

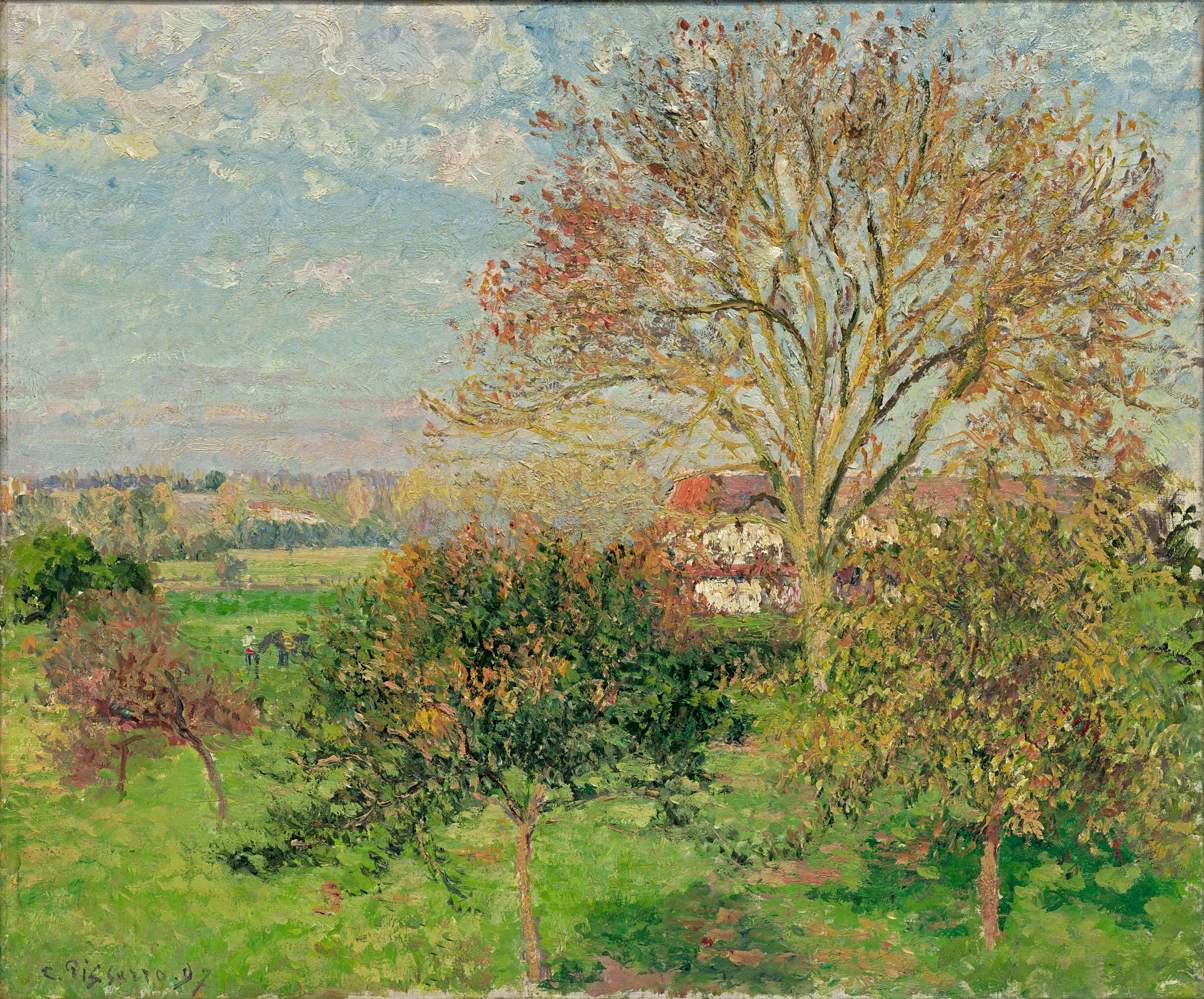
- Artist: Camille Pissarro
- Year: 1897
- Medium: oil on canvas
- Dimensions: 54 cm × 65 cm (21 in × 26 in)
- Location: Pushkin Museum of Fine Arts, Moscow

The Large Walnut Tree, Autumn Morning, Éragny is an oil on canvas painting by Camille Pissarro, from 1897. It is held in the Pushkin Museum, in Moscow.

== History ==
It was painted at Éragny-sur-Epte, where the artist had lived permanently since 1884. The same garden had been subjects for him ever since he moved there, with the first depiction of it being the 1884 painting Fog in Éragny (now lost but known through a 1904 reproduction). Large Walnut Tree, Hoarfrost in the Sun (Mohamed Mahmoud Khalil Museum, Giza, Egypt) and Large Walnut Tree in the Spring, Éragny (private collection), both painted in 1894, both portray exactly the same spot as the Moscow work but from a different angle, whilst there are quite a few other fairly close works produced both before and after 1897, with his last painting of his garden was Apple Trees and Haystack in Éragny, Morning Sun, produced just before his death in 1903 (Basel Art Museum).

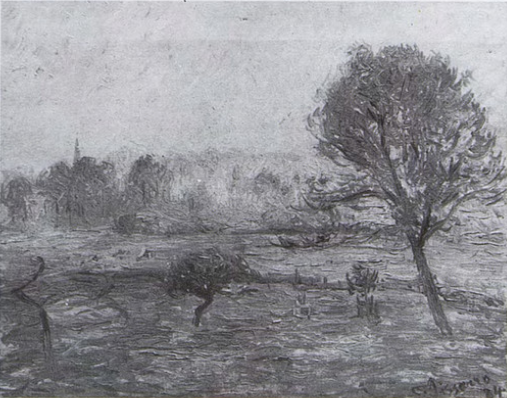
Fog in Éragny, 1884

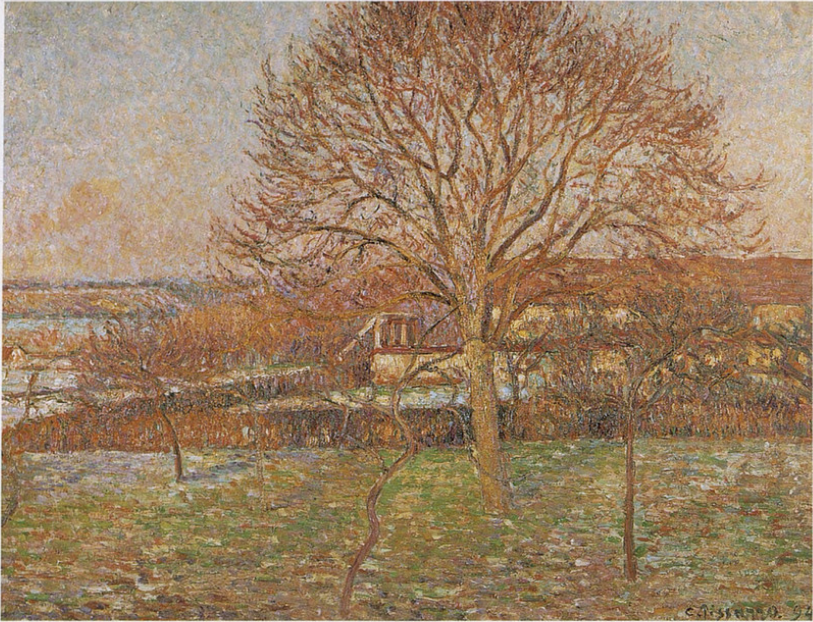
Large Walnut Tree, Hoarfrost in the Sun, 1894

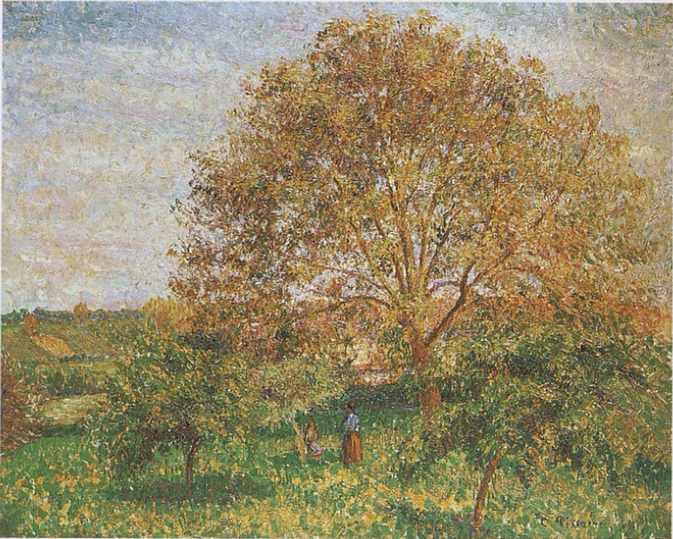
Large Walnut Tree in the Spring, Éragny, 1894

The work now in Moscow was first owned by Parisian Doctor Georges Viot. Viot's collection was put up for sale at Paul Durand-Ruel's gallery early in 1907 and on 4 March that year it was bought by Ivan Morozov, whose collection was seized by the Soviet state after the October Revolution. It was placed in the State Museum of Modern Western Art in 1923 and on that museum's closure in 1948 moved to its present home.

== See also ==
- List of paintings by Camille Pissarro
