= Mohsen Shaalan =

Egyptian artist and government minister

- Born: 14 April 1951; Cairo, Egypt
- Died: 9 February 2014 (aged 62); Cairo, Egypt
- Occupations: Deputy minister of culture, artist

Mohsen Shaalan or Shalaan (14 April 1951 – 9 February 2014) was an Egyptian artist and deputy minister of culture, serving as the head of the fine arts sector from 2006 until 2010. He was ousted from his position in the Ministry of Culture following the 2010 theft of Van Gogh's Poppy Flowers from the Mohamed Mahmoud Khalil Museum in Cairo. He served one year in prison on charges stemming from the theft, which prosecutors argued was made possible by insufficient security under his watch.

== Background ==
Shaalan was born in Cairo, Egypt, in 1951. He received a Bachelor of Arts in art and education in 1974. He held several positions within Egypt's Ministry of Culture before eventually being appointed the head of the fine arts sector in 2006. In this position, Shaalan was responsible for overseeing various museums and art institutions throughout Egypt, including the Mohamed Mahmoud Khalil Museum, which houses one of the largest collections of 18th and 19th century European art in the Middle East. While in the position, he worked to restore various cultural institutions, including the Aisha Fahmy Palace, the Rateb Sedeek Art Gallery, and the 1952 Revolution Heroes Museum.

== Trial and imprisonment ==
In August 2010, van Gogh's Poppy Flowers was stolen from the Mohamed Mahmoud Khalil Museum, one of the museums under Shaalan's oversight. At the time of the theft, the painting was appraised at $55 million. While the thieves were never caught, and the painting remains missing as of 2021, Shaalan and others within the Ministry of Culture were promptly investigated for creating or perpetuating the conditions that allowed the theft to occur. Among the allegations were that guards did not check on museum visitors, that none of the alarms in the museum worked, and that only seven out of the museum's 43 surveillance cameras were operational at the time of the theft. Shaalan later conceded that museum security was poor, but contended that he was not personally responsible and had raised the point to his superiors several times, including specifically informing culture minister Farouk Hosny that the museum's security cameras were not functional as early as 2007. Shaalan stated that despite these warnings, he was not given the resources necessary to improve security. Prior to the theft, Shaalan had requested nearly $7 million to increase museum security, but only $88,000 was approved.

At trial, Shaalan and 10 other Ministry of Culture employees were found guilty of negligence and sentenced to three years in prison, but were released on bail of about $1,750 pending appeal. Upon appeal, Shaalan's convictions for negligence and professional delinquency were upheld, but his sentence was reduced to one year in prison.

While in jail, Shaalan created many artworks and channeled his experiences of being imprisoned into his work.

== Later life ==
After being released from jail, Shaalan put on many exhibitions of his work, focusing on those he created while incarcerated. Among his exhibitions was Black Cat: a Prison Experience, held at the Gezira Center for Modern Art in Cairo, which showcased the pieces that he had created while in jail. His works have been acquired by many museums, including the Library of Congress in Washington, D.C., the Cairo Opera House, and the Goethe Institute in Cairo.

Shaalan died on 9 February 2014 at his home in Cairo.
