= Al Musafir Khana Palace =

Coordinates: 30°03′26″N 31°15′57″E

The Musafir Khana Palace also known as the Musafirkana Palace was built in Cairo, Egypt between 1779 and 1788 by Mahmud Muharram; a wealthy merchant. Muhammad Ali Pasha bought the palace in early 19th century to use as a royal guesthouse. It was the birthplace of his grandson Khedive Ismai'l 1830-1895. In 1998, it burned to the ground. It was an excellent example of the Ottoman Style.

== See also ==
- List of palaces in Egypt
