= Uljay al-Yusufi =

Mamluk Sultanate military officer

- الجاي اليوسفي
- Other name: Iljay
- Occupation: Mamluk amir

Uljay al-Yusufi, also known as Iljay (Arabic: الجاي اليوسفي, romanized: Uljāy al-Yūsufī; d. 8 Muharram 775 AH / 1 July 1373 CE), was a senior Mamluk amir in the late eighth century AH/fourteenth century CE. It was during the reign of Bahri Sultan al-Ashraf Sha'ban that he briefly held the highest military office of commander in chief of the army (atabak al-'asakir) and was administrator of the Complex of al-Mansur Qalawun which included the famous hospital (bimaristan).

== Life and career ==
Little is known about Uljay al-Yusufi's early life and career. Although he was promoted to the highest rank of amirs (amir mi'a, muqaddam alf) in 759/1358 during the second reign of al-Nasir Hasan, it was only after his marriage into the royal family that his power increased. Ibn Taghribirdi notes that he was simply a prominent Mamluk emir, until his marriage to the mother of the reigning sultan, Khawand Baraka. Thereafter, he quickly became more influential and was promoted to the position of commander of the army (atabak al-'asakir) in early 774 AH/ 1372 CE, and put in charge of the bimaristan at the same time.

However, his fortune did not last and his influence ended as quickly as it began. It was only a short time after his wife died later in the same year (Dhu al-Qadah 774), and was buried in the madrasah that his relationship with his son-in-law, al-Malik al-Ashraf, began to rapidly fall apart.

During the first days of the following year (6 Muharram 775AH/ 27 June 1373CE) Uljay had a bitter disagreement with the sultan, al-Malik al-Ashraf, over the inheritance of Khawand Baraka. This disagreement soon grew into a violent confrontation between the troops of the sultan and the mamluks of Uljay. In the ensuing battles, Uljay's troops were defeated, and he had to withdraw. The Sultan reportedly offered Uljay the position of governor in the Syrian province of Hama, which Uljay was not ready accept, unless he was allowed to keep all his property, as well as his troops. The sultan was not ready to grant this concession and sent his troops to pursue Uljay, who drowned in the Nile while attempting to flee.

According to the chronicler Ibn Taghribirdi, the sultan felt regret at the news of Uljay's death and ordered divers to retrieve the corpse of his opponent. al-Malik al-Ashraf then arranged for Uljay to be buried with honours in his mosque-madrasah (see below).

== Public works ==
Uljay commissioned the construction of the Madrasa of Uljay al-Yusufi complex in the district of Al-Darb al-Ahmar in the year 774 AH/ 1373 CE. The mosque is of the cruciform type with four iwans, similar to the mosque-madrasahs of Sultan Hassan, or Sarghatmish. The most remarkable feature of the building is its ribbed dome.
