= Poppy Flowers =

Painting by Vincent van Gogh

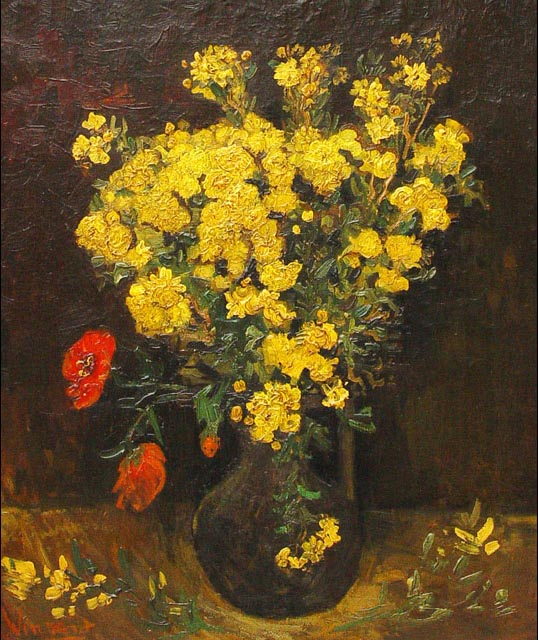
- Artist: Vincent van Gogh
- Year: 1887
- Catalogue: F324a; JH1137
- Type: Still life
- Medium: Oil on canvas
- Dimensions: 65 cm × 54 cm (26 in × 21 in)
- Location: Switzerland

Poppy Flowers (also known as Vase And Flowers and Vase with Viscaria) is a painting by Vincent van Gogh with an estimated value of US$55 million which was stolen from Cairo's Mohamed Mahmoud Khalil Museum twice; first in 1977 (and recovered after a decade), then again in August 2010.

The painting is small, measuring 65 x 54 cm, and depicts yellow and red poppy flowers. It is believed that van Gogh painted it in 1887, three years before his suicide. The painting, which is of a vase of yellow and red poppies, contrasted against a dark ground is a reflection of Van Gogh's deep admiration for Adolphe Monticelli, an older painter whose work influenced him when he first saw it in Paris in 1886.

== 1977 theft ==
The painting had been stolen from Cairo's Mohamed Mahmoud Khalil Museum on June 4, 1977, and was recovered ten years later in Kuwait.

== 2010 theft ==
The painting was once again stolen from the same museum in August 2010. Egyptian officials erroneously believed they had recovered the painting only hours after its theft when two Italian suspects attempted to board a plane to Italy at Cairo International Airport.

== Reaction to theft ==
In October 2010, an Egyptian court found 11 culture ministry employees, including Deputy Culture Minister Mohsen Shaalan, guilty of negligence and professional delinquency. Each was sentenced to three years in jail but subsequently released on bail of about $1,750 pending appeal. After the appeal, Shaalan served a one-year prison term ending in 2013.

Egyptian billionaire Naguib Sawiris put up a $175,000 or 1,000,000 Egyptian pounds reward for information leading to the return of the painting.

== See also ==
- List of works by Vincent van Gogh
- List of stolen paintings
