= Bayt al-Razzaz =

Place in Cairo

Coordinates: 30°02′15″N 31°15′33″E

- بيت الرزاز
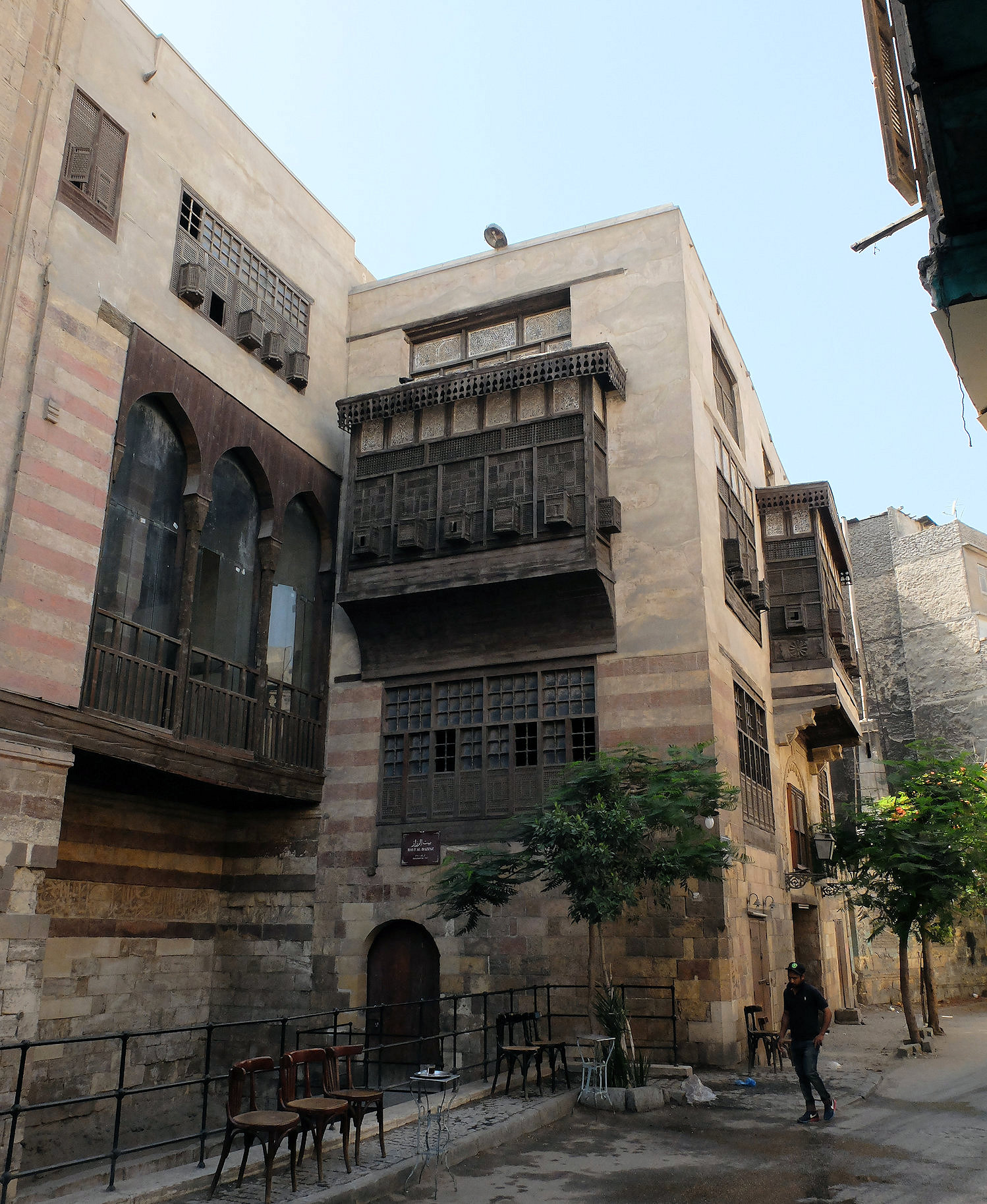
- Bayt al-Razzaz today, as seen from the street.
- Interactive map of the Bayt al-Razzaz area

General information
- Type: Mansion
- Architectural style: Mamluk Era
- Location: 56 Bab al-Wazir Street, Cairo, Egypt
- Completed: 1480
- Renovated: 1977-2007

Technical details
- Material: Stone, brick and wood
- Floor count: 4

Other information
- Number of rooms: 190

Bayt al-Razzaz (Arabic: بيت الرزاز) is a mansion in the heart of medieval Cairo, Egypt, constructed from the late 15th century through the late 18th century. The 190-room urban palace in the Darb al-Ahmar neighborhood of medieval Cairo was abandoned in the 1960s, but a restoration project rehabilitated the eastern building between 1977 and 2007. The property belongs to the Ministry of State for Antiquities, which has plans to restore the western complex. It is also currently a place of many Egyptian craftsmen and women, with many local-artistic workshops.

== Description ==
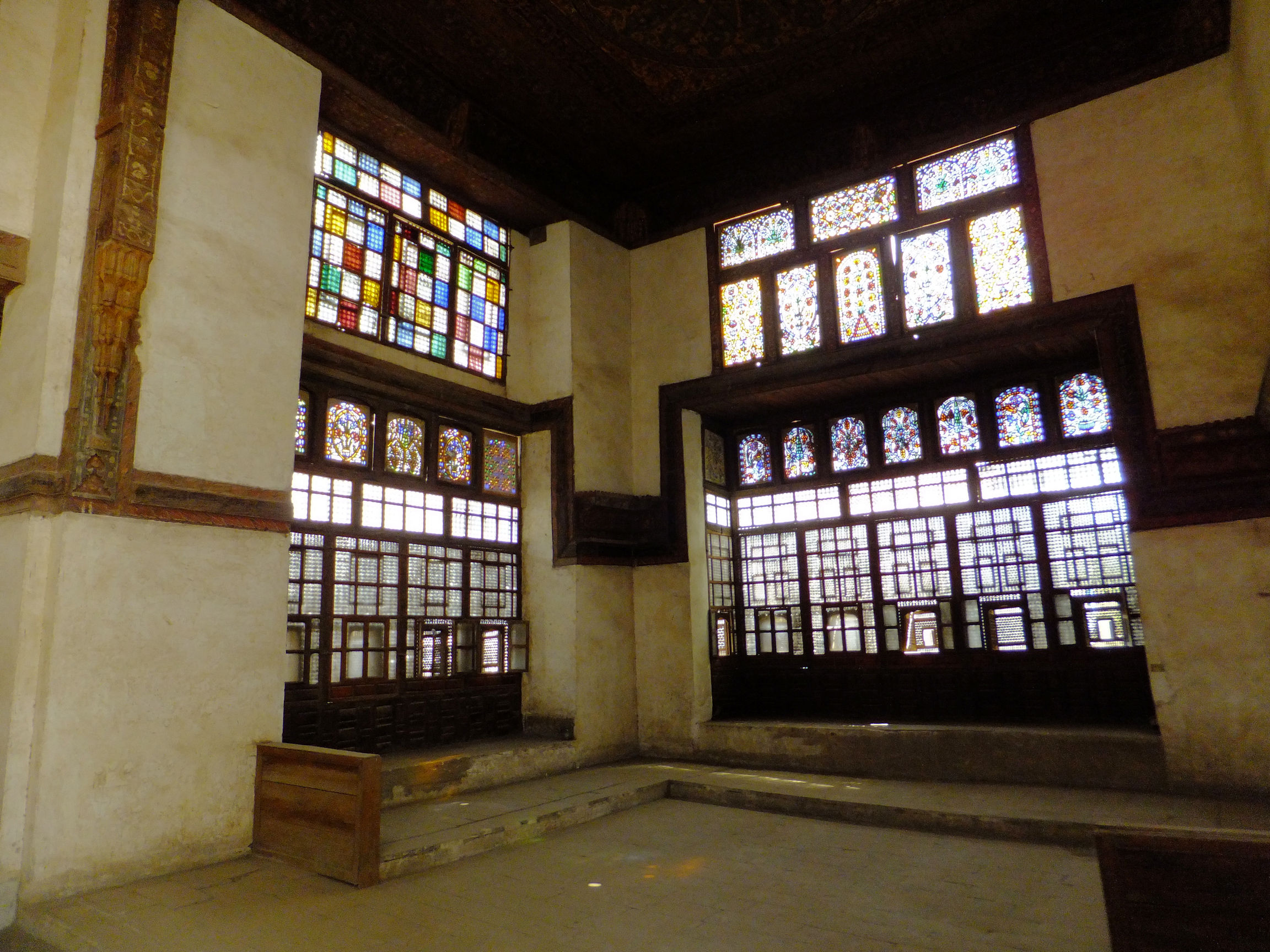
A room with mashrabiyyas on the upper floors

Originally built in the 15th century during the Mamluk era, Bayt al-Razzaz is a mansion now comprising two houses, two central courtyards, and other utility structures such as stables, baths, storerooms, etc. The number of buildings along with its size gives the structure the impression of being palatial. The two properties, which collectively comprise 190 rooms, were connected via a single passageway sometime in the early 19th century, as a result of a marriage contract.

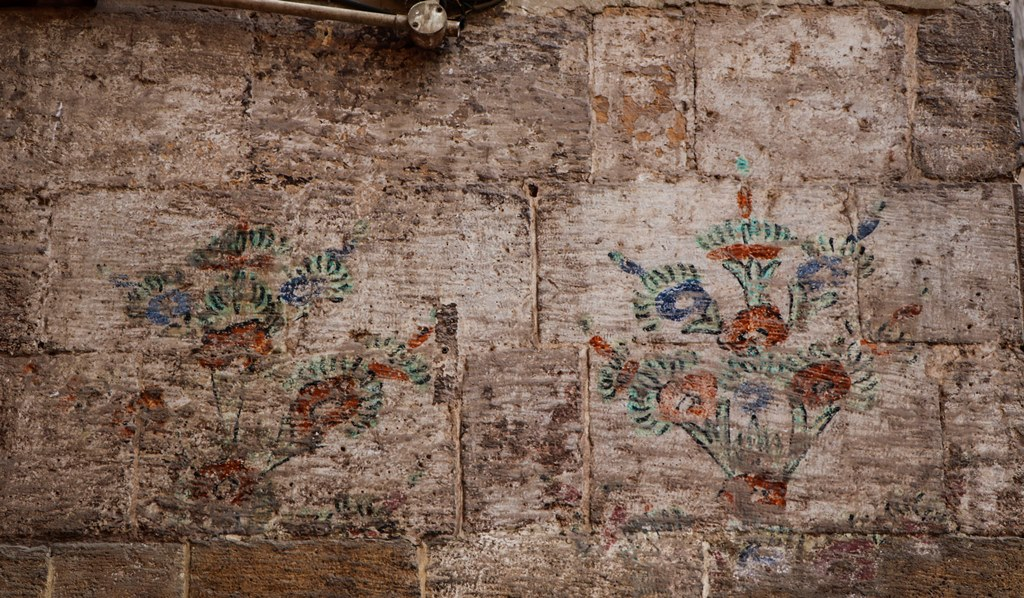
Courtyard wall painting

The first house (eastern side) was built in around 1480 by Sultan Qaytbay and features highly decorative mashrabiya windows on the second floor, overlooking the street and others looking out over the courtyard. One of the doorways on the eastern side of the courtyard is decorated in the Mamluk style and includes the cartouche or blazon of Qaytbay. The structure is primarily of stone and brick, with carved wooden windows. Interior walls and ceilings are of finely painted wood panels. The flat roof is constructed of layers of mortar over horizontal sheathing boards. The second floor was used as the women's quarters while the downstairs area was occupied by the men.

The second house (western side) was built by a wealthy rice merchant, Ahmad Katkhuda al-Razzaz, in the 18th century, probably to accommodate a growing family and an increasingly complex network of relationships. The buildings were occupied by the same families for centuries.

Situated in Darb al-Ahmar neighbourhood, the complex occupies a vast area and is bounded by Bab al-Wazir Street on one side, and the Suwayqat al-'Izza/Suq al-Silah on the other, with entrances on both streets, and is adjacent to the Mosque of Umm Sha'ban.

The structure was abandoned in the 1960s, and became the property of the Ministry of State for Antiquities (formerly the Supreme Council of Antiquities). From the late 1970s, a team led by American Research Center in Egypt carried out restoration work on the eastern complex which were completed in 2007. The western building remains in need of restoration and the Ministry has plans to restore it for use as offices, however in light of the political unrest in Egypt, the World Monuments Fund considers the project to be "at risk".

== Gallery ==
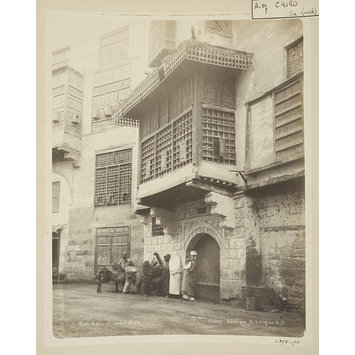
Entrance to Bayt al-Razzaz, photograph by Gabriel Lekegian, late 19th century

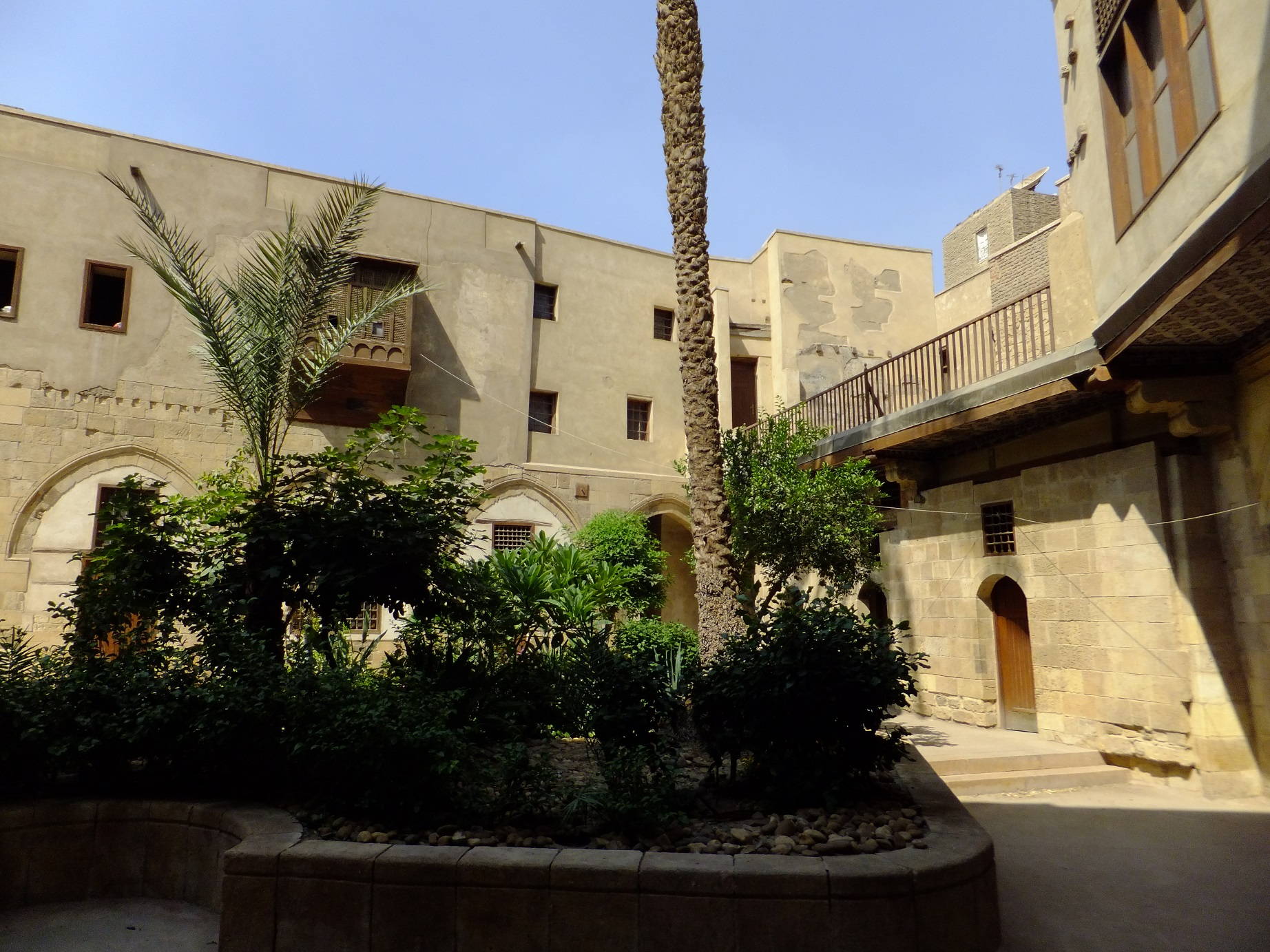
Courtyard of the palace

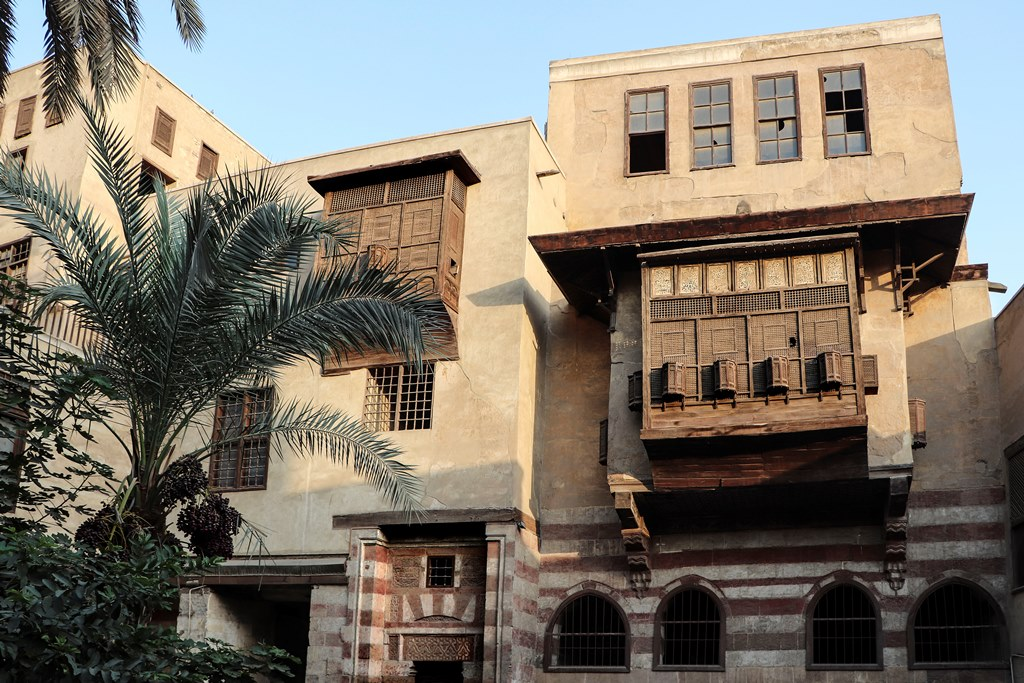
Eastern front seen from the courtyard

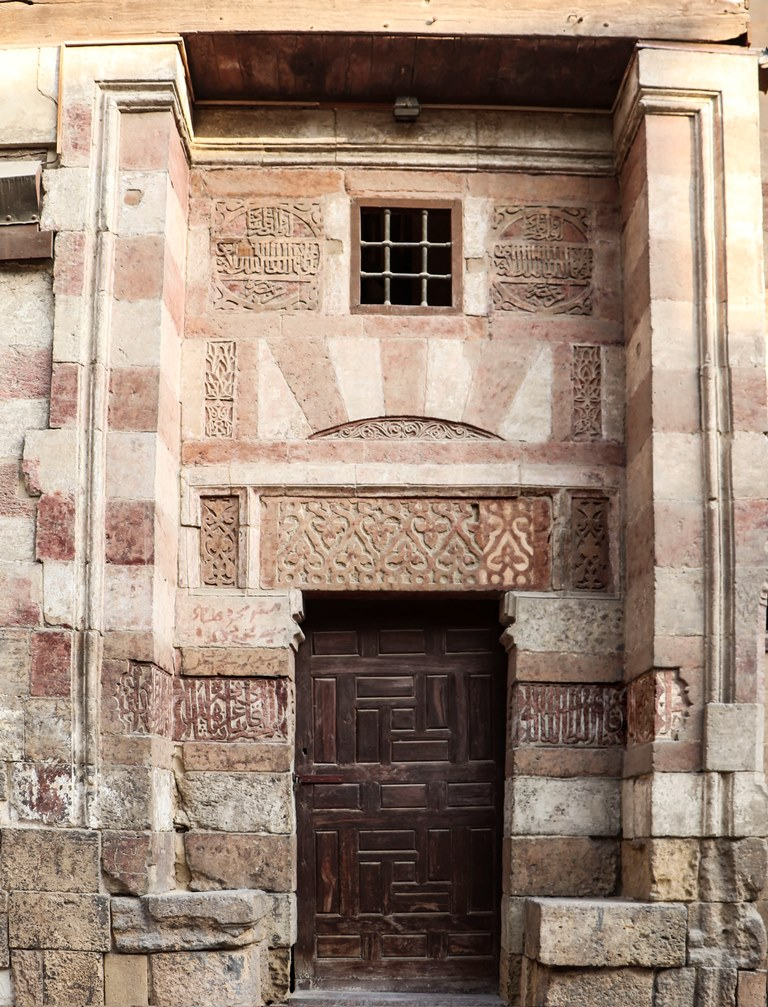
Blazon of Qaitbay above the eastern door lintel

== See also ==
- Madrasa of Umm al-Sultan Sha'ban
- Islamic architecture
- K. A. C. Creswell - architectural historian and photographer who documented Bayt al-Razzaz and other historic buildings in Egypt in the late 18th century
- Mamluk architecture
- Ottoman architecture
