= Bayt al-Sinnari =

- بيت السنارى
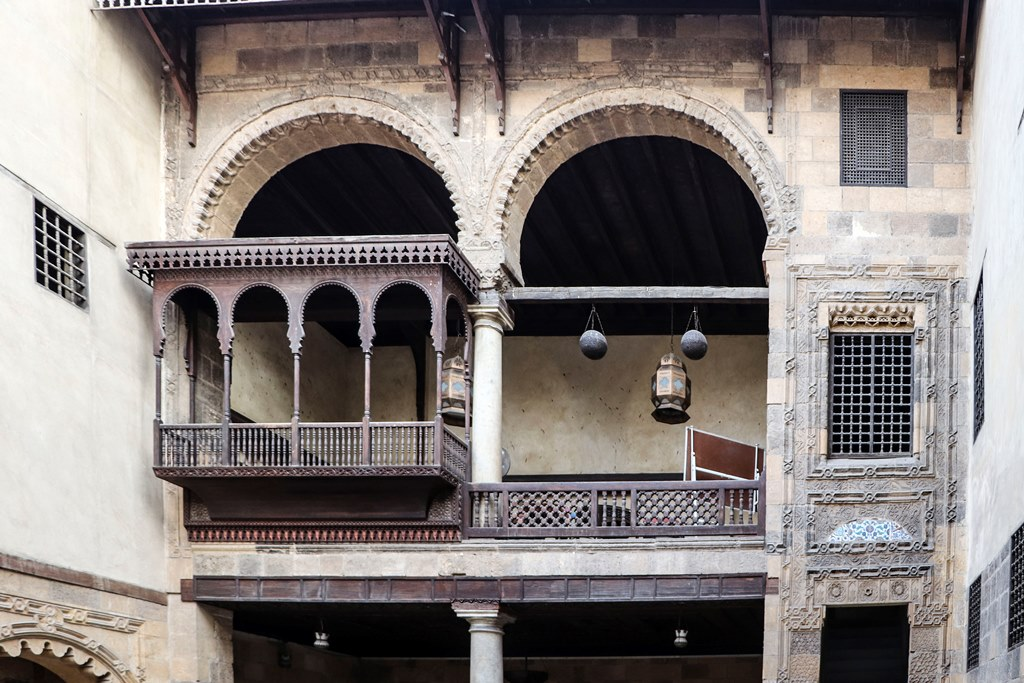
- Bayt al-Sinnari today, courtyard façade
- Interactive map of the Bayt al-Sinnari area

General information
- Type: Mansion
- Architectural style: Ottoman style
- Location: Monge passage, Cairo, Egypt
- Coordinates: 30.0329°N 31.242°E
- Completed: 1794
- Renovated: 2002

Technical details
- Material: Stone and wood

Website
- Official website

Bayt al-Sinnari, built in 1794, is one of the remaining bourgeois mansions in medieval Cairo, Egypt. Managed by the Bibliotheca Alexandrina, the house has become an important cultural center after its restoration.

== Location ==
Located in the neighborhood of the Al-Sayeda Zainab Mosque, Bayt Al Sinnari is reached through the dead-end Monge passage, named after Gaspard Monge, who accompanied the French campaign to Egypt.

== History ==
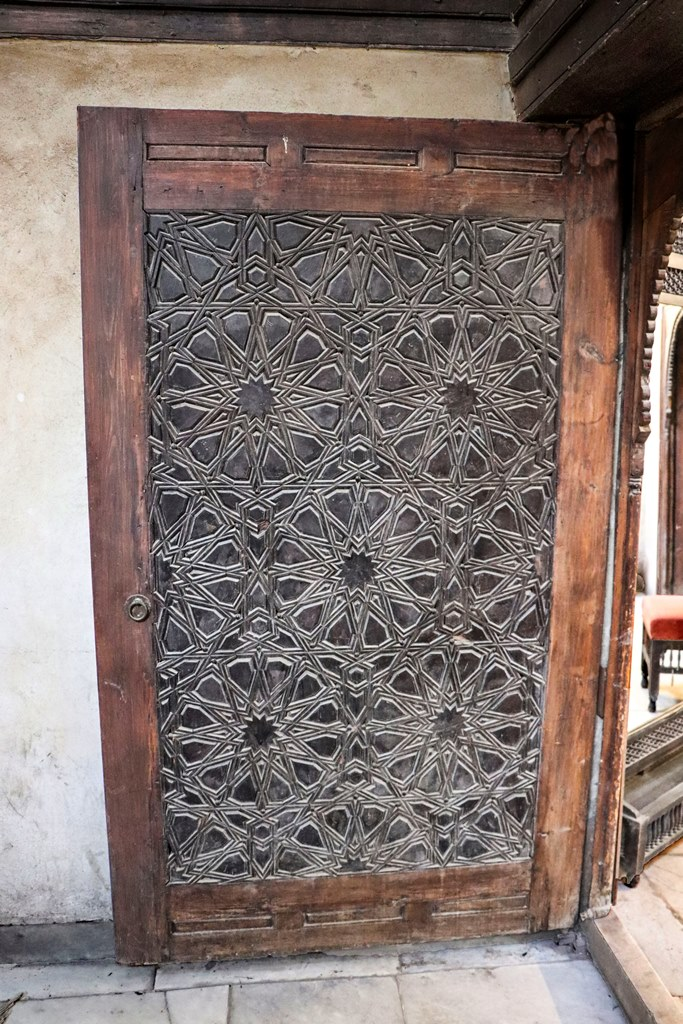
Door in sculpted stone

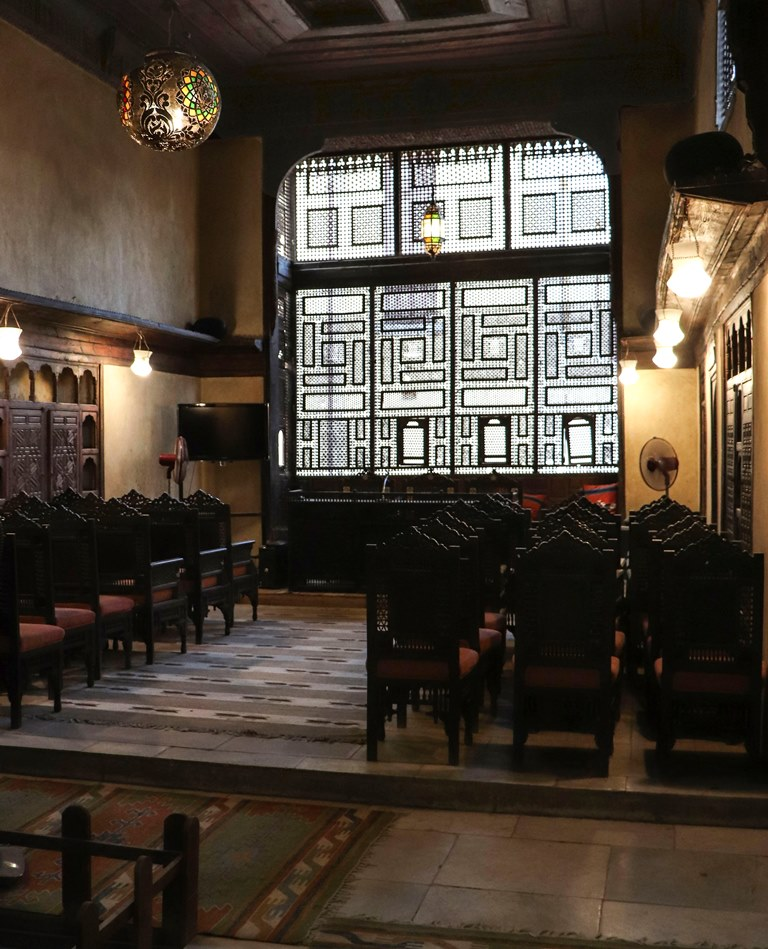
Beautiful masharabiyya

Bayt Al Sinnari was built in 1794 by Ibrahim Katkhuda al-Sinnari, whose surname refers to the city of Sennar. In 1798, the house was confiscated by the French to house the members of the Committee of Sciences and Arts, that accompanied Napoleon Bonaparte to Egypt. Its mission was to conduct a systematic study of Egypt, published in the famous Description de l'Égypte. Gaspard Monge, eponym of the passage, in which the house is located, was president, Napoleon Bonaparte deputy, and Joseph Fourier secretary. However, with the departure of the French expedition in 1801, the institute closed down.

From 1917 to 1933 Bayt Al Sinnari housed a private Napoleon museum. In the aftermath of the 1992 Cairo earthquake the house underwent an elaborate restoration process. France, Egypt and the UNESCO cooperated in the salvage of the house. Today, the house is an important cultural center.

== Architecture ==
Bayt al-Sinnari is composed of two distinct sections: the ground-floor with all the reception areas on the western side, and the second floor comprising the private apartments with a mashrabiyya of magnificent woodwork and a small hammam. The house has an interior court centered by a marble fountain.

== Sources ==
- Bayt al-Sinnari on Youtube
- Bayt al-Sinnari on Facebook
