= Anisa Wissa Palace =

Historical residential building in Egypt

General information
- Architectural style: Eclectic architecture, combining Islamic and European features
- Location: Fayoum, Egypt
- Completed: 1898
- Client: Hanna Saleh Nissim

Technical details
- Size: 4,000 meters

The Anisa Wissa Palace is a historical residential building in Fayoum, Egypt.

== History ==
The palace was constructed in 1898 on the orders of an Egyptian socialite, Hanna Saleh Nissim. It was built as a gift for his wife, Anisa Wissa, and named after her.

== Style and technical features ==
The palace was constructed following an eclectic approach, combining Islamic and European architecture. The wood from France and Italy was used in the construction. Total area of the building is 4500 meters. The courtyard of the palace is decorated with Italian statues. The inside walls of the palace are ornamented, and the mirrors and marble fireplaces are heavily used in the palace.

== Current usage ==
Following the death of Wissa, her family the palace leased to the Egyptian government. It was registered on the antiquities list. Then it was sold to the Egyptian agronomists' syndicate. Next it was transferred to the State Council.
