= Mohamed Mahmoud Khalil Museum =

Museum in Giza, Egypt

Coordinates: 30°2′8″N 31°13′11″E

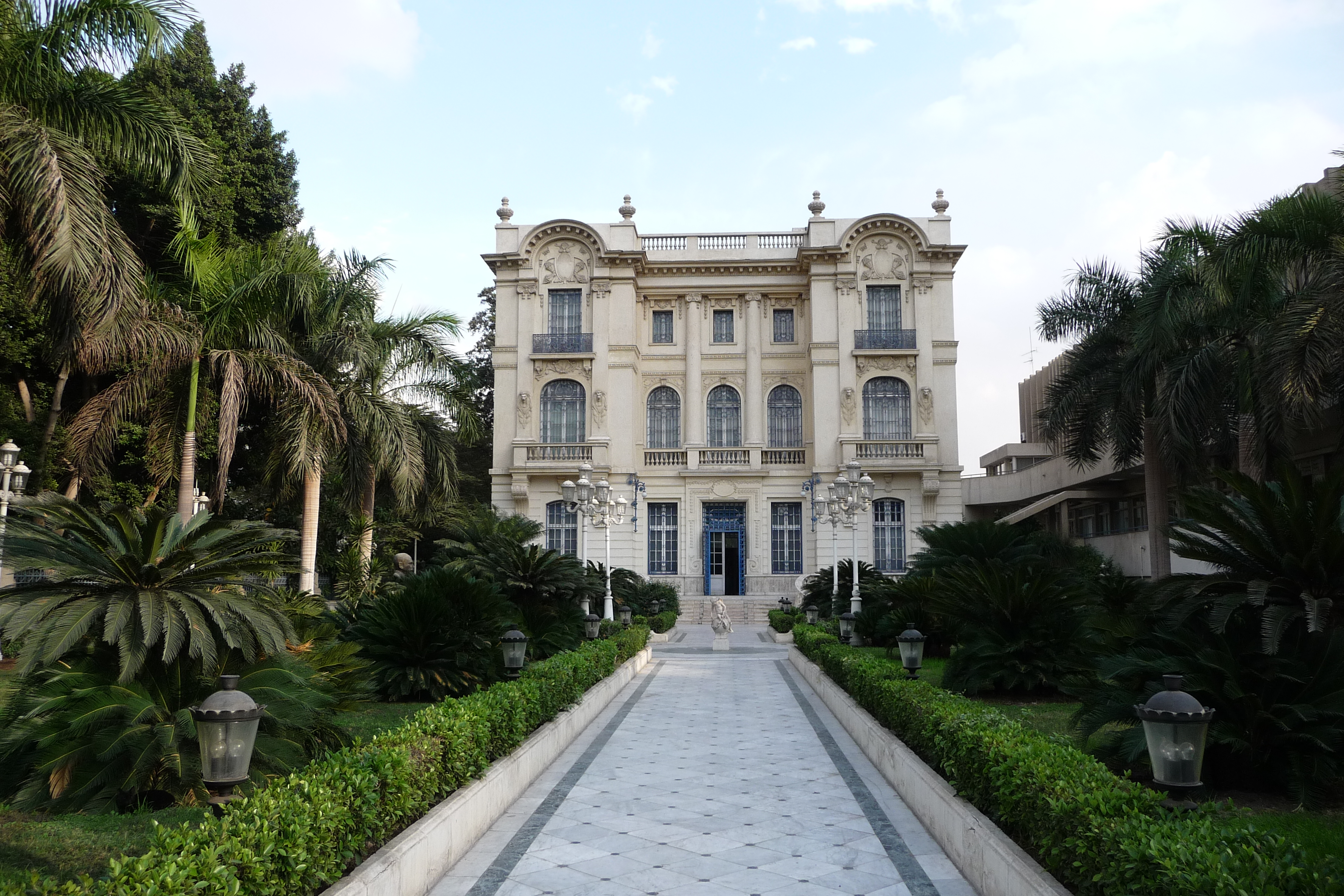
- Museum facade
- Established: 23 July 1962
- Location: Giza, Egypt
- Type: Art museum
- Collections: Art, Paintings, Modern
- President: Minister of Tourism and Antiquities
- Owner: Government of Egypt
- Parking: On Site

The Mohamed Mahmoud Khalil Museum is a museum in Giza, Egypt. It is located in a palace built in the early 20th century.

== History ==
This museum is housed purchased by Mohamed Mahmoud Khalil (1877-1953) in 1918. Mahmoud Khalil was an Egyptian politician, he held the position of the Prime Minister of Egypt twice from 1928 to 1929 and 1937 to 1939. He also held the position of the Minister of Agriculture in 1937, President of the Senate, 1939 to 1940, founder of the Cairo Society of Friends of Fine Arts in 1924, commissioner of the Egyptian pavilion at the 1937 International Exposition, and corresponding member of the Academy of Fine Arts in 1948.

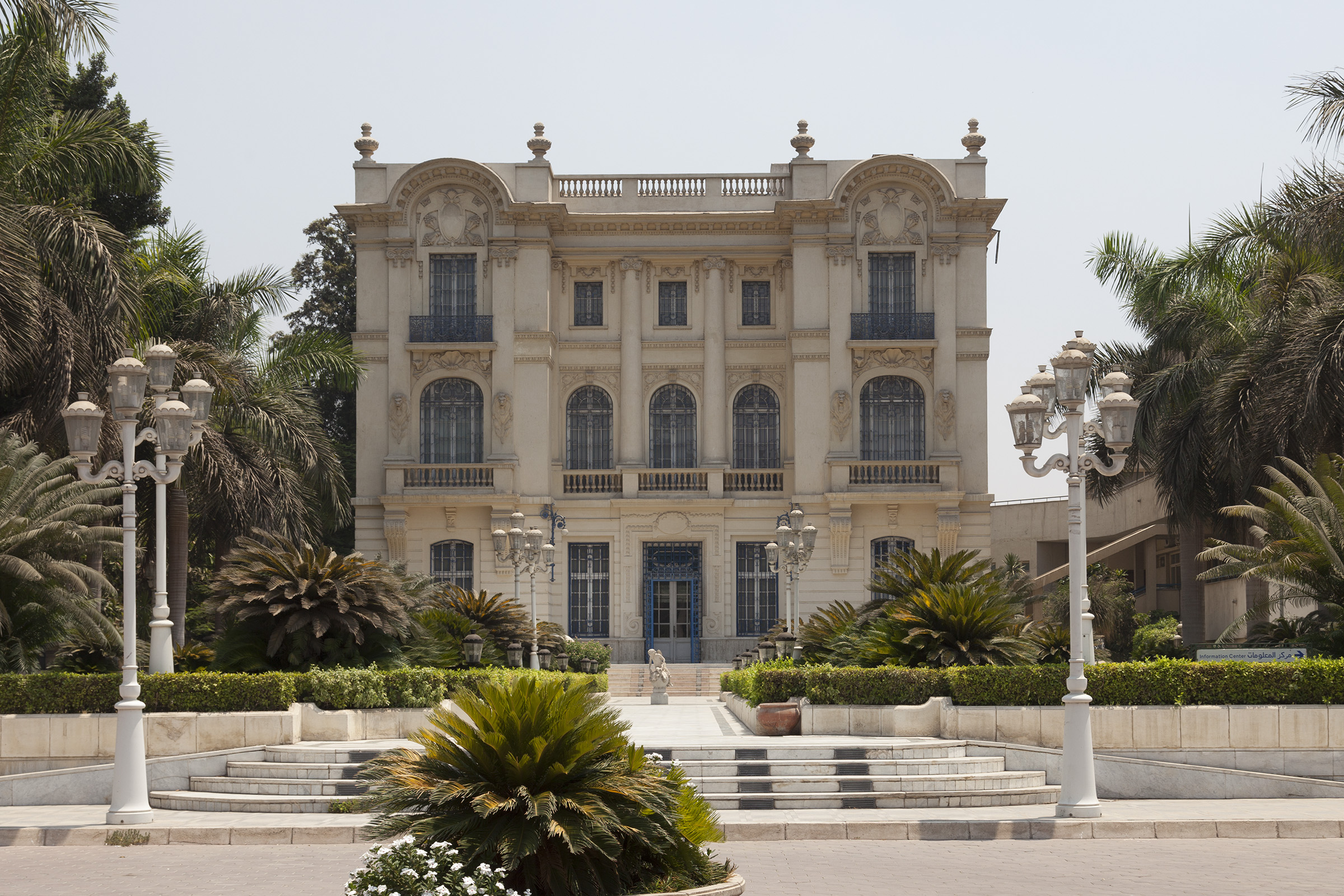
Museum entrance

Khalil and his wife had amassed a significant collection of French art objects, primarily Impressionist paintings, but also sculptures. The museum was opened on 23 July 1962, and dedicated to the memory of Mohammed Mahmoud Khalil and his wife Emiline Lock. In 1971 it was sectioned by the government of Egypt; President Anwar El-Sadat used it for executive offices. The palace was returned to museum use in 1993. In 1995, and the museum reopened.

== Collection ==
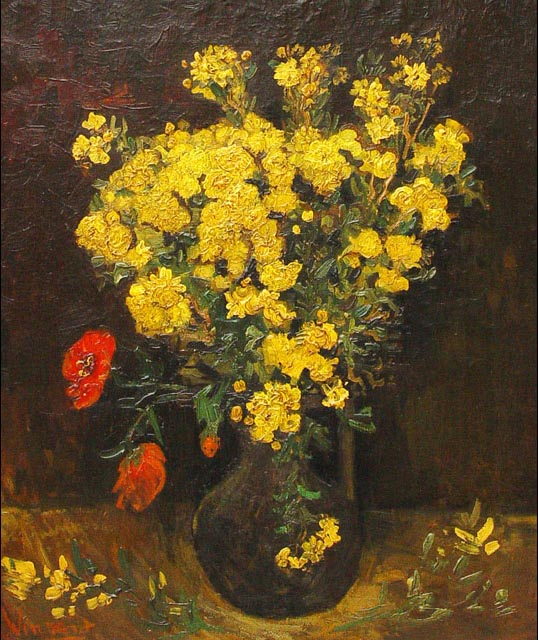
Poppy Flowers (1887) by Vincent van Gogh was cut from its frame and stolen from the museum in 2010

Among the great artists works endowed by Mohammed Mahmoud Khalil and his wife are those of Paul Gauguin, Claude Monet, Auguste Renoir, Alfred Sisley, Auguste Rodin and Vincent van Gogh. The Museum houses a fine collection of Impressionist paintings, mainly collected before 1928, which alone rivals most European National Collections.

=== Art thefts ===
A van Gogh painting known both as Poppy Flowers, also known as Vase and Flowers and Vase with Viscaria was cut from its frame and stolen from the museum in August 2010. Several members of Egypt's Ministry of Culture, including Deputy Minister of Culture Mohsen Shaalan, faced criminal charges as a result of the theft, with prosecutors arguing that they created or perpetuated the conditions that allowed the crime to occur. Previously, the painting had been stolen from the museum's temporary location in 1978, and recovered 10 years later in Kuwait. Nine paintings of the 19th-century Egyptian ruler Ibrahim Pasha were stolen in 2009, and were found 10 days later dumped outside.

== See also ==
- List of palaces in Egypt
