= Qasaba of Radwan Bey =

Historic site in Cairo, Egypt

- قَـصَـبَـة رضوان بيه (Arabic)
- Street of the Tentmakers, Souq al-Khayamiya
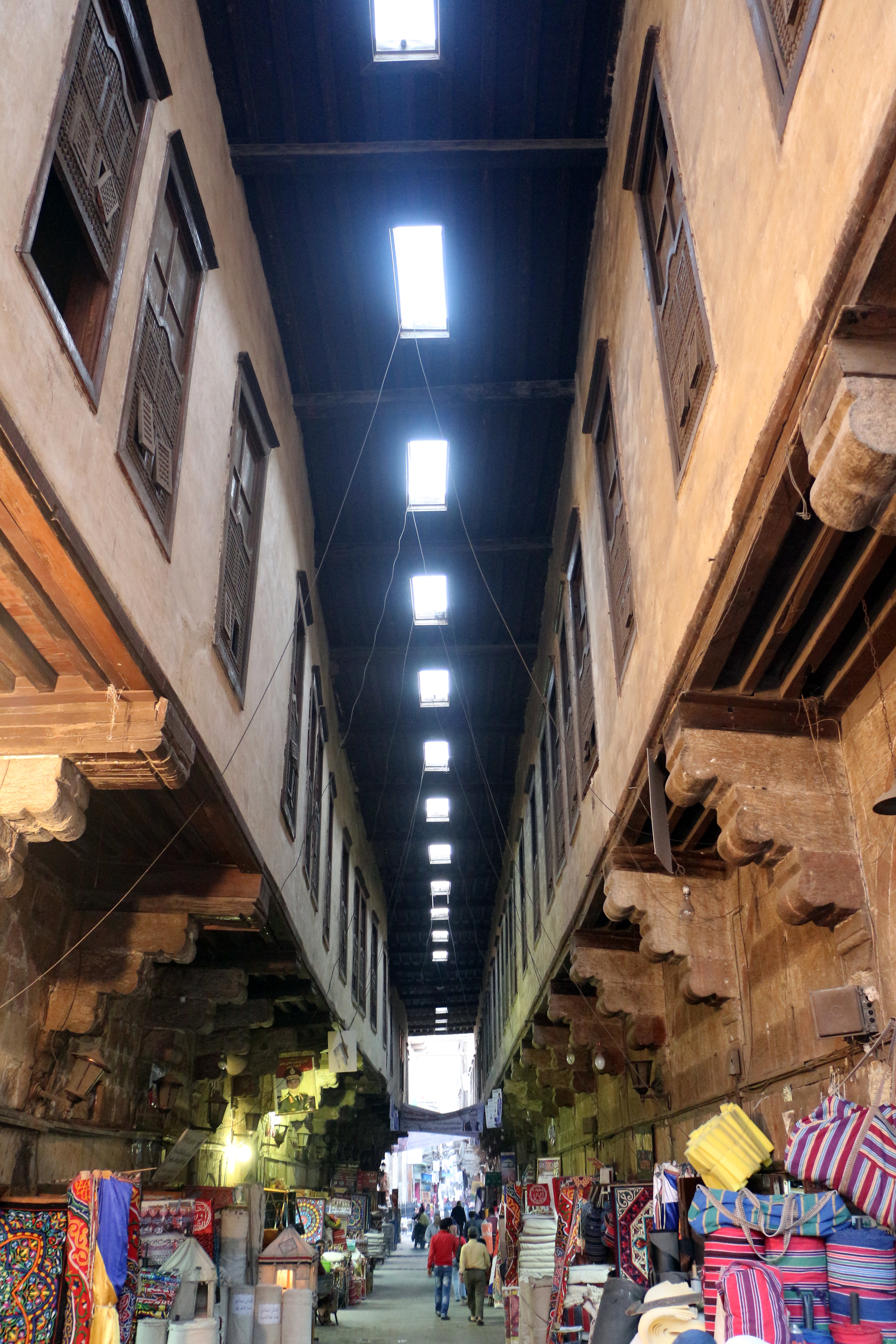
- The Qasaba or covered market street

- Location within Egypt
- 30°02′31.29″N 31°15′27.1836″E
- Type: historic souq (covered market)
- Location: Cairo, Egypt

History
- Founder: Radwan Bey
- Built: c. 1650
- Original use: Shoemakers' market; commercial and charitable complex attached to aristocratic residence

Site notes
- Current use: khayamiya (decorative textile) market

The Qasaba of Radwan Bey is a souq and covered market in Cairo, Egypt, located directly south of the Bab Zuweila gate and just outside the historic walled city. It dates to around 1650 CE, when its founder, Radwan Bey, initiated a series of constructions in this area. It is the only existing example of a historic covered market street in Cairo. Today it is also known as the Street of the Tentmakers or al-Khayamiya, the last major market dedicated to the sale of decorative textiles known as khayamiya.

== Historical background ==
=== Patron and context ===
The market was built by Radwan (or Ridwan) Bey, a Mamluk Bey who dominated the politics of Egypt from 1631 to 1656 (CE). His influence was partly based on the fact that he occupied for a remarkable 25 years the important post of amir al-hajj, the official in charge of organizing the pilgrimage to Mecca (hajj) which departed from Cairo every year.

The market was built in the context of one of several urbanization enterprises carried out by powerful and wealthy officials in the 17th century which sought to develop the southern districts of Cairo between Bab Zuweila and the Citadel. Radwan Bey reorganized and rebuilt the district which had been formerly occupied by tanneries just outside Bab Zuweila. The area had also been occupied by various residences and a few older religious buildings (such as the Mosque of Salih Tala'i and the Mosque of al-Kurdi, both still standing today).

The location of Radwan Bey's complex followed a clear logic in the economic geography of Cairo at the time. Since Fatimid times (10th century), the main commercial axis of Cairo was a street with a north–south orientation running between Bab Zuweila and Bab al-Futuh (the southern and northern gates of the Fatimid city, respectively). This street is known today as al-Mu'izz street but was also referred to as the qasaba ("avenue"). It had been the center of the city's commercial and economic activity since its Fatimid foundation. (The well-known Khan al-Khalili, for example, is located along this axis.) South of Bab Zuweila, beyond the old Fatimid walls, the road continued south to Saliba Street and ultimately all the way to the Southern Cemetery of Cairo. Radwan Bey's construction thus helped to extend the main commercial axis of Cairo further south beyond Bab Zuweila as the city developed in this direction.

=== Construction ===
Radwan Bey carried out a series of constructions in the area from at least 1629 to 1647 (as recorded in waqf documents). Radwan established not only a new covered market but also a wikala (caravanserai), a rab' (rental apartment building), one or two zawiyas, a sabil (public water dispensary) and maktab (primary school), two minor mosques, and his own palace. These various elements were more or less connected together and formed one large complex. Caroline Williams dates the covered market to around the year 1650. Parts of the street were widened and straightened along areas of new construction in Radwan Bey's projects. Another element of the complex, the combined sabil and maktab, is dated to 1650 by the waqf documents and was most likely the last part of the complex to be built.

Radwan Bay's palace was adjacent to the market and located just south of it, on the west side of the street. Only a small part of it remains today. The site of his mansion had also been the site of other palaces as far back as the 13th century. Directly north of the palace was located the wikala or caravanserai, also adjacent to the market.

According to historian André Raymond, the market was originally built to house shoemakers in Radwan Bey's time. The association of the market with the guild of tentmakers (khayyāmīn) is also documented from at least the 17th century.

=== Present day ===
Over time, many of the elements of Radwan Bey's original development have disappeared or been built over, but the covered market remains relatively well-preserved and one of the most impressive remaining examples of purpose-built commercial/economic buildings in historic Cairo. Only fragments of Radwan's mansion also remain. Restoration works were carried out on the market between 2002 and 2004 to restore the market's street facades.

Today, the area is popularly known as al-Khayamiya or Suq al-Khayyāmiya, a market dedicated to the sale of khayamiya textiles, a type of traditional decorative appliqué textile used for tentmaking.

== Architecture ==
The whole complex built by Radwan Bey extended around 150 meters along the main street. Some 50 meters or more of this street is covered by a wooden roof pierced with skylights. On both sides of the street, the ground level of the building is built in stone and features large bays or spaces for shops facing the street, while the upper level is built of wood and is supported by thick wooden corbels at regular intervals that allow it to project further over the street. These upper floors provided apartments where the artisans or others could live (a type of building referred to in documents as a rab').

Parts of Radwan's mansion also still remain at the southern end of the covered market, on the western side of the street. Here, a stone portal leads to a courtyard that once was part of the palace. Here one can see some mashrabiya (wooden screen) windows and, on the southern side, a maq'ad or second-story loggia that once overlooked the house's courtyard. Some decorative marble along the walls of the maq'ad still remain.

== Gallery ==
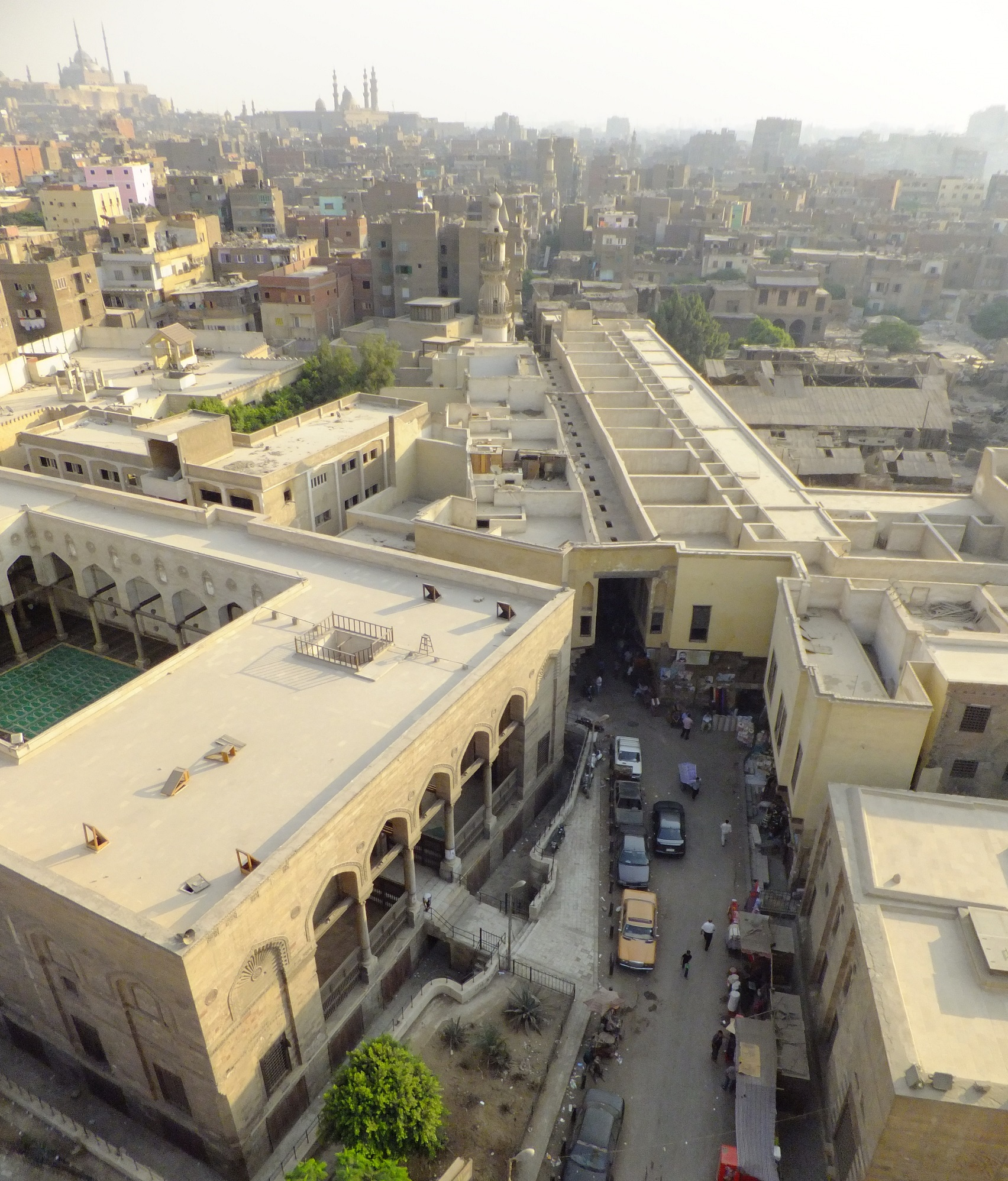
View of the qasaba (centre) from above, from one of the minarets of Bab Zuweila. (The building on the bottom left is the Mosque of Salih Tala'i.)

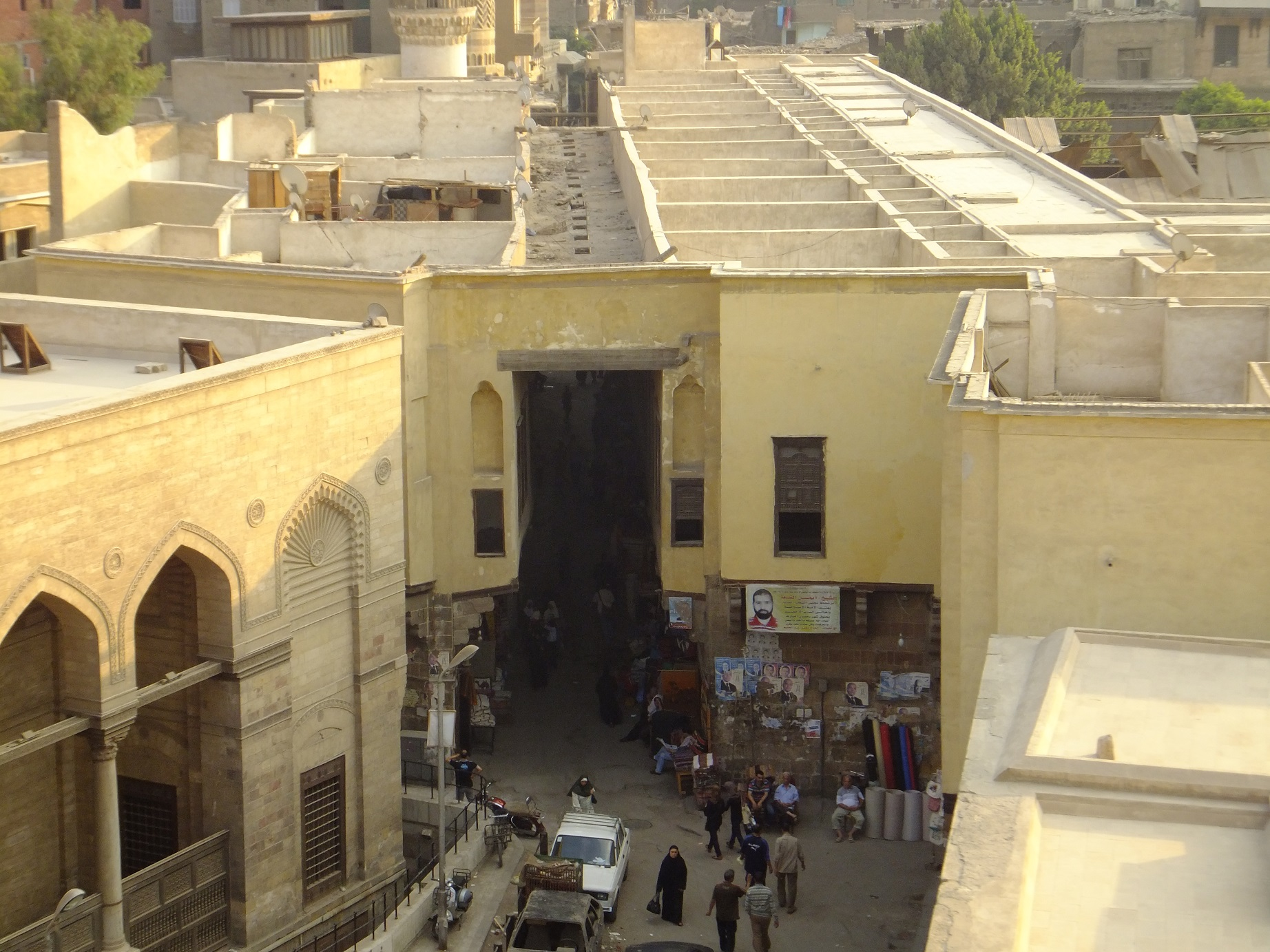
The northern entrance to the qasaba.

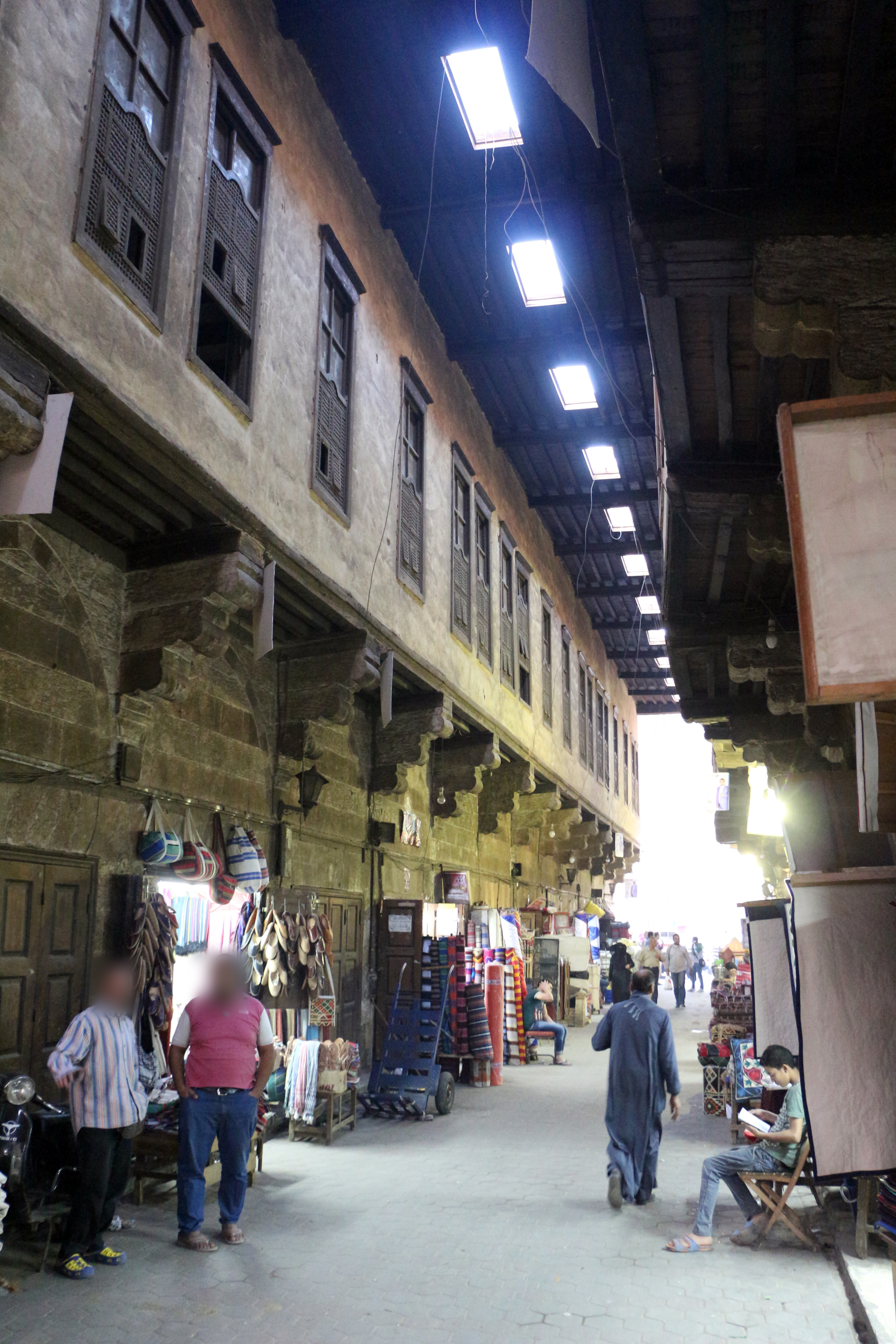
The street.

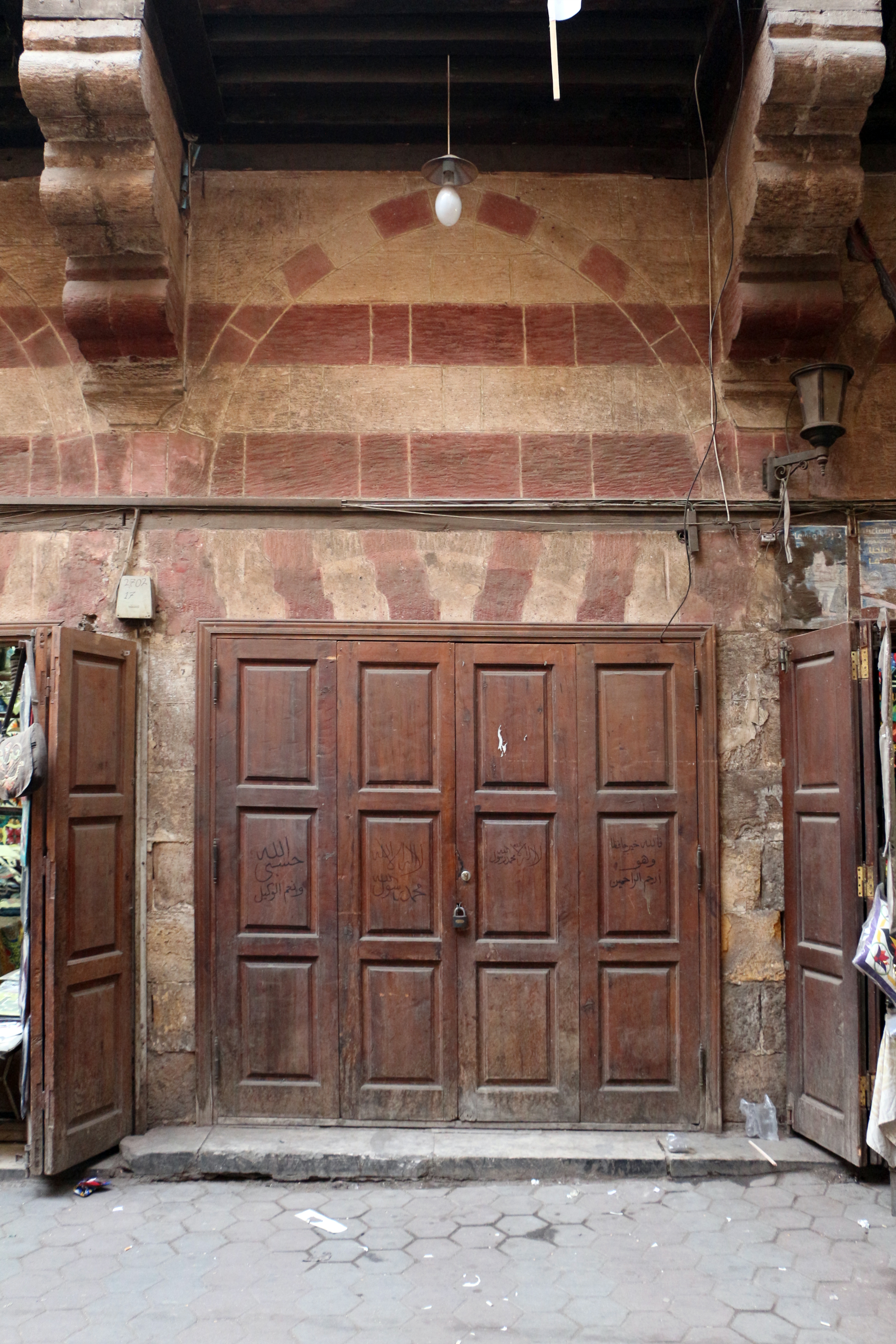
One of the bays at street level occupied by shops.

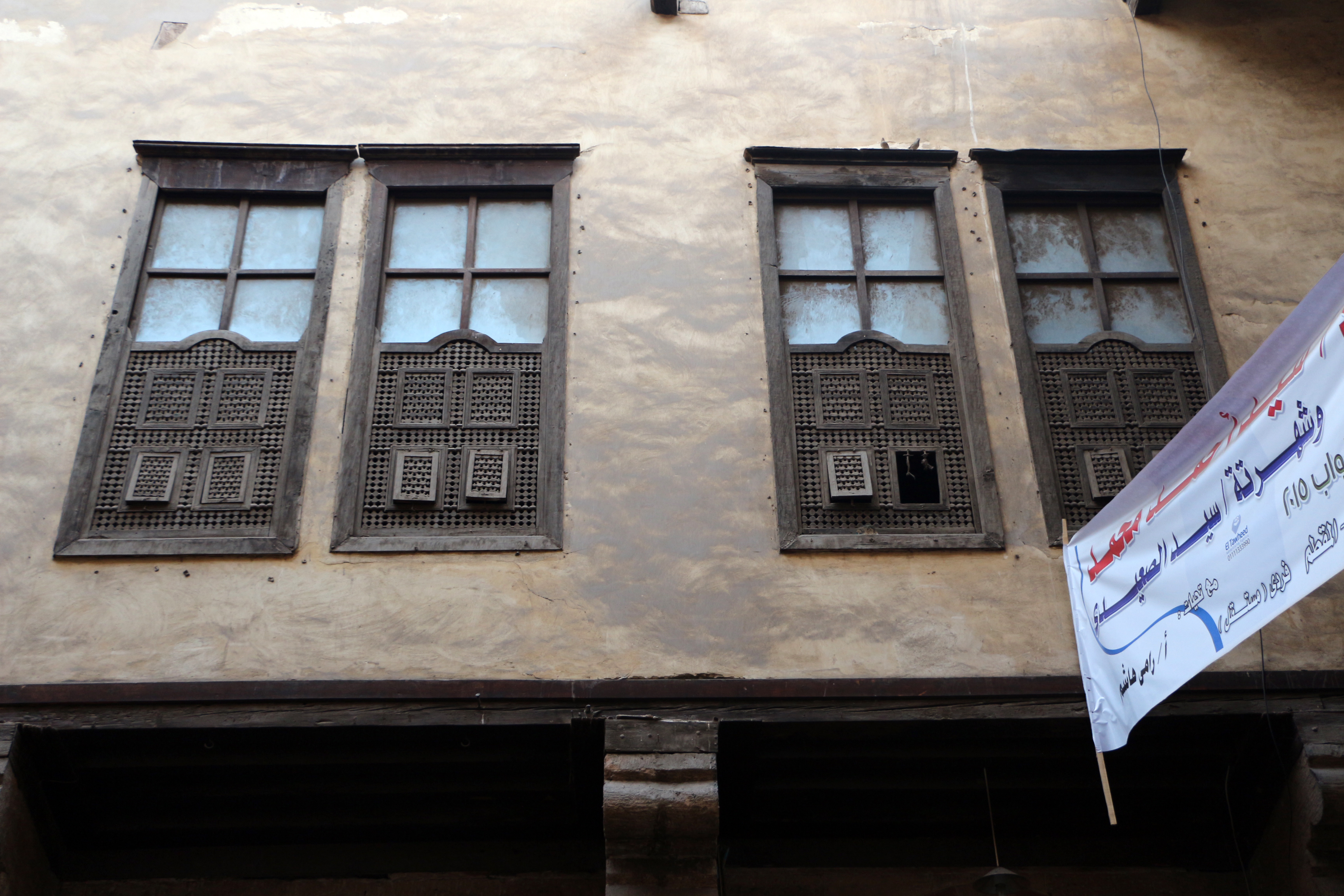
Street-facing windows of the upper floor, occupied by living apartments.

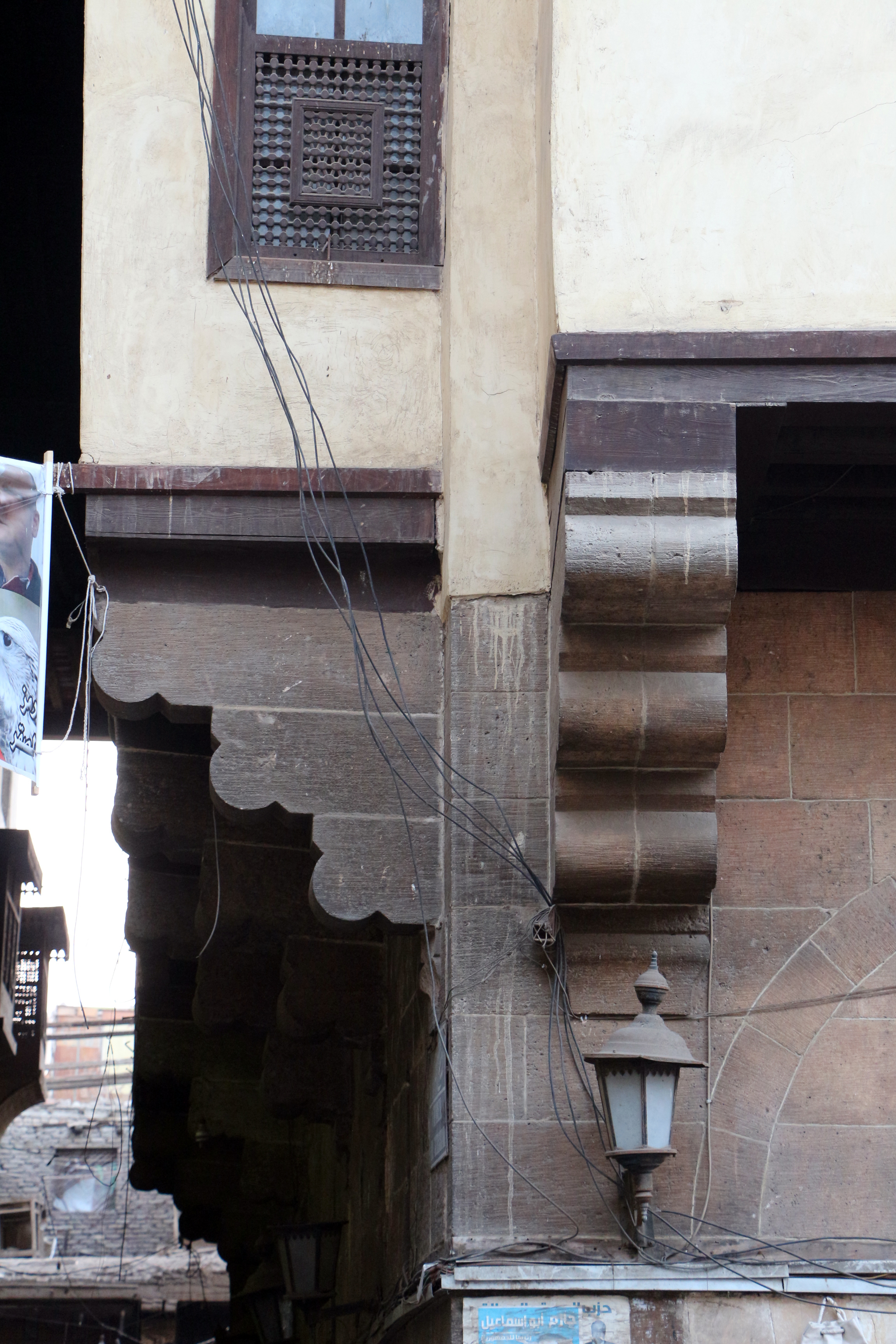
The corbels holding up the upper floor.

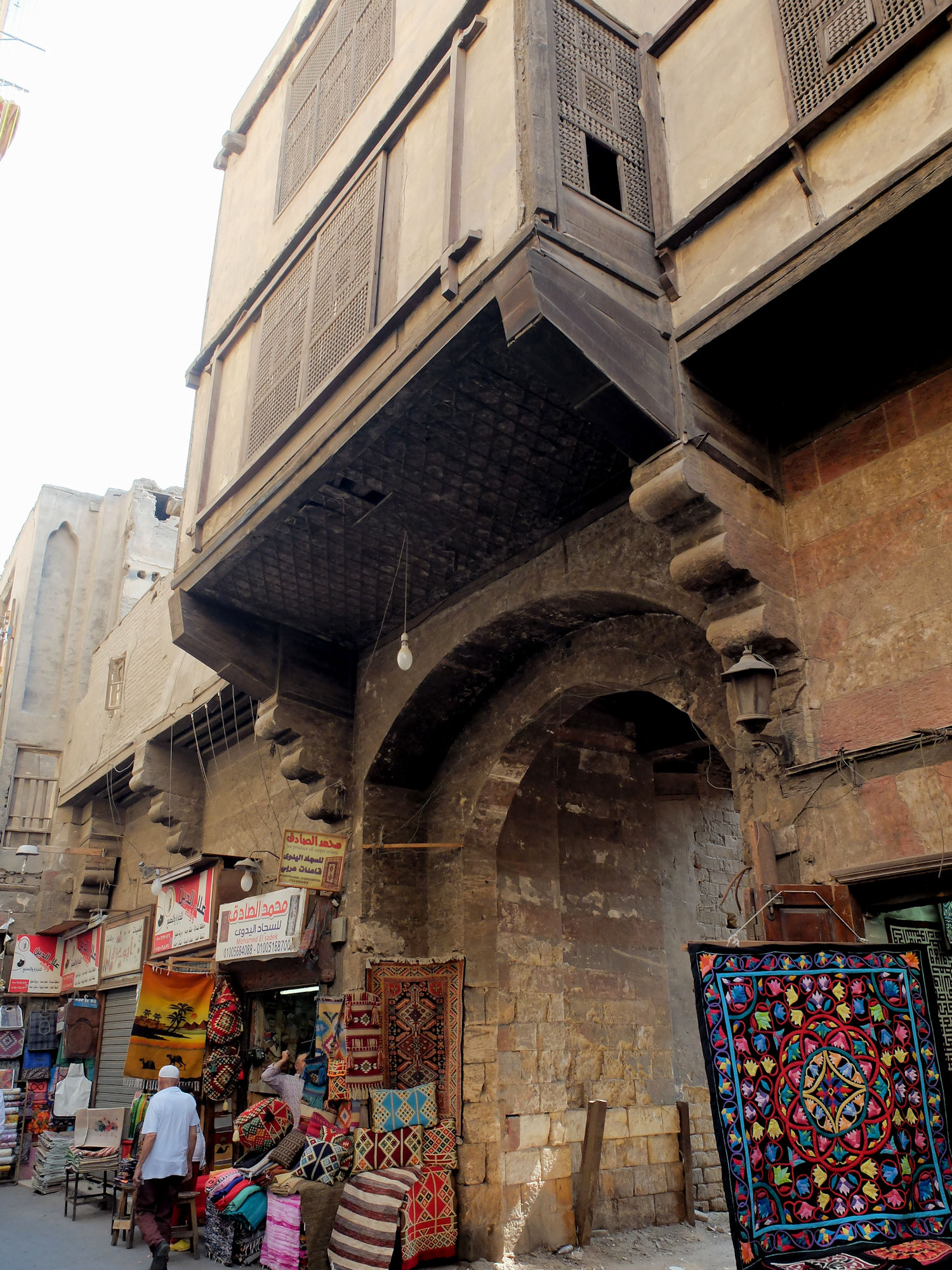
Entrance to the former mansion of Radwan Bey, at the southwestern end of the market (opposite the al-Kurdi Mosque).

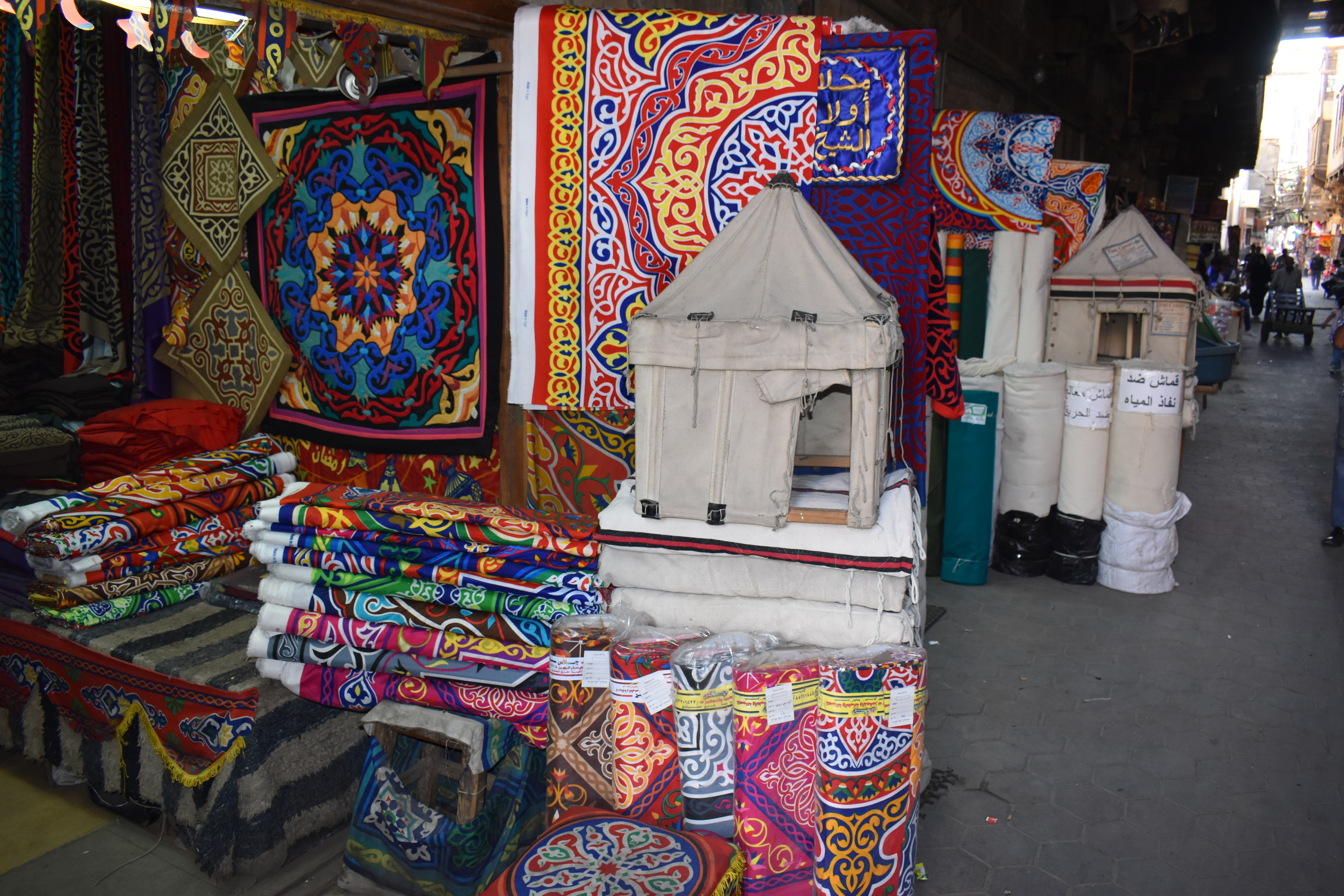
Shops along the Street of the Tentmakers, in the Qasaba of Radwan Bey, selling khayamiya textiles.
