= Mahmud al-Kurdi Mosque =

Mosque in Cairo, Egypt

- مسجد الكردي
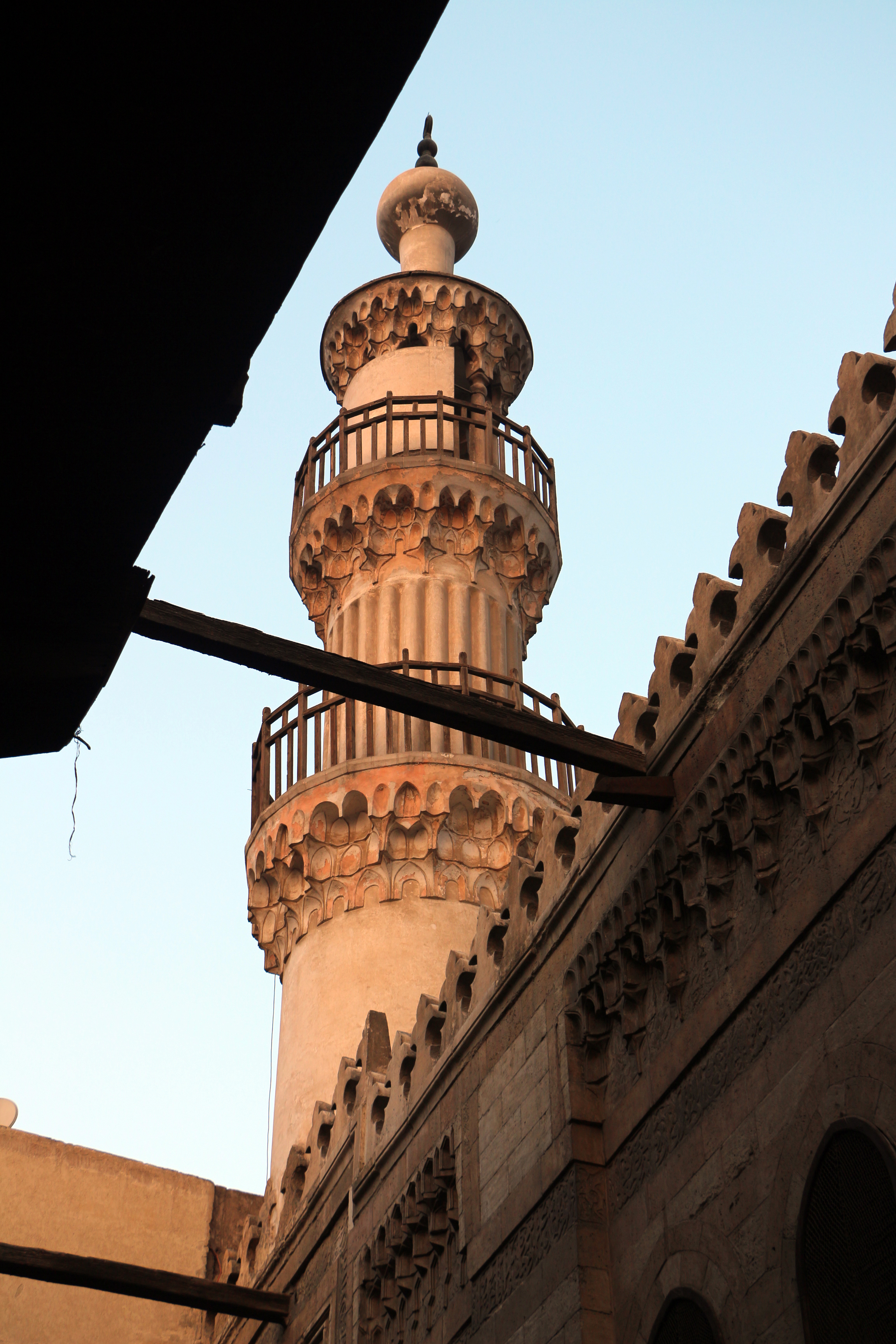

Religion
- Affiliation: Islam
- Ecclesiastical or organisational status: Mosque
- Status: Active

Location
- Location: Al-Darb al-Ahmar, Islamic Cairo
- Country: Egypt
- Interactive map of Mahmud al-Kurdi Mosque
- Coordinates: 30°02′28″N 31°15′27″E

Architecture
- Style: Mamluk; Islamic
- Founder: Mahmud al-Kurdi
- Completed: 1395 CE

Specifications
- Dome: 1
- Minaret: 1
- Materials: Stone

The Mahmud al-Kurdi Mosque (Arabic: مسجد الكردي), also known as the Jamal al-Din Mahmud al-Istadar Mosque (Arabic: مسجد جمال الدين محمود الاستادار), is a mosque in the al-Darb al-Ahmar area of Islamic Cairo, Egypt. It was founded by an amir called Mahmud al-Kurdi who was the ustadar or majordomo of the Mamluk Sultan Barquq. It is located just south of the Qasaba of Radwan Bey (or Tentmakers' Street) which branches out from the Ahmad Maher Street.

== History ==
The mosque was completed in 1395 CE.

Restoration work by the Ministry of Antiquity began in 1979 and was completed in 2004. Subsequently, the minaret was plastered in white.

== Architecture ==
This small mosque has a few notable characteristics. The dome is among the earliest stone domes to be carved with a horizontal chevron pattern. This style replaced the pre-14th century brick and plaster ribbing on such domes. The dome is sitting on the drum with eight windows. The minaret is also notable for its round form which is unusual for this period, and was heavily used later in Ottoman architecture. The original inscriptions and decorations have been retained on the facade, window frame, and the doors. The metal doors to the mosque feature excellent craftsmanship, including geometric star patterns and arabesque carvings across the surface. The interior of the mosque compound has two iwans and is notable for its resemblance to a qa'a (reception hall in domestic or palace architecture), which possibly indicates that the mosque was converted from a house.

== Gallery ==
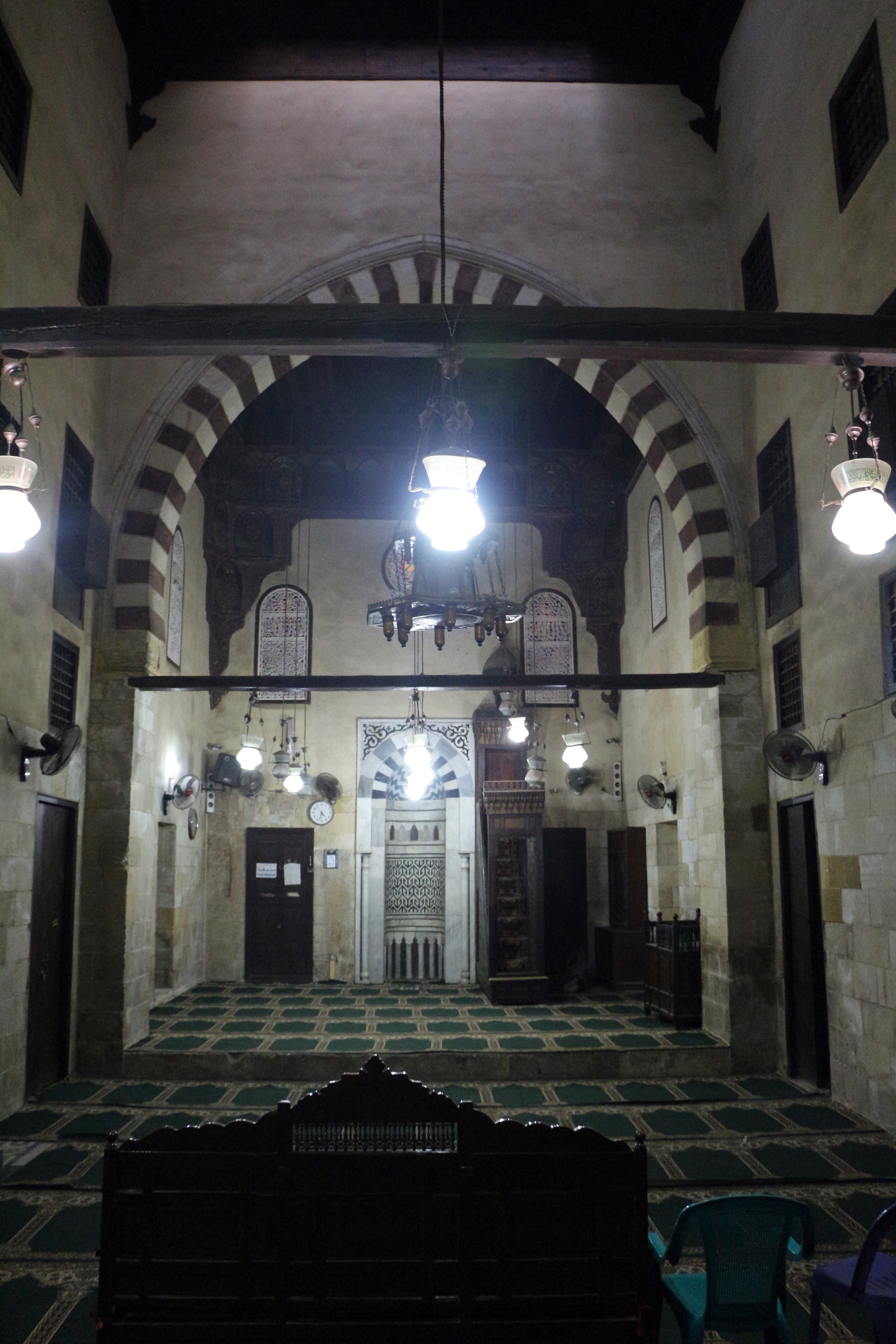
The mosque interior, which resembles a qa'a

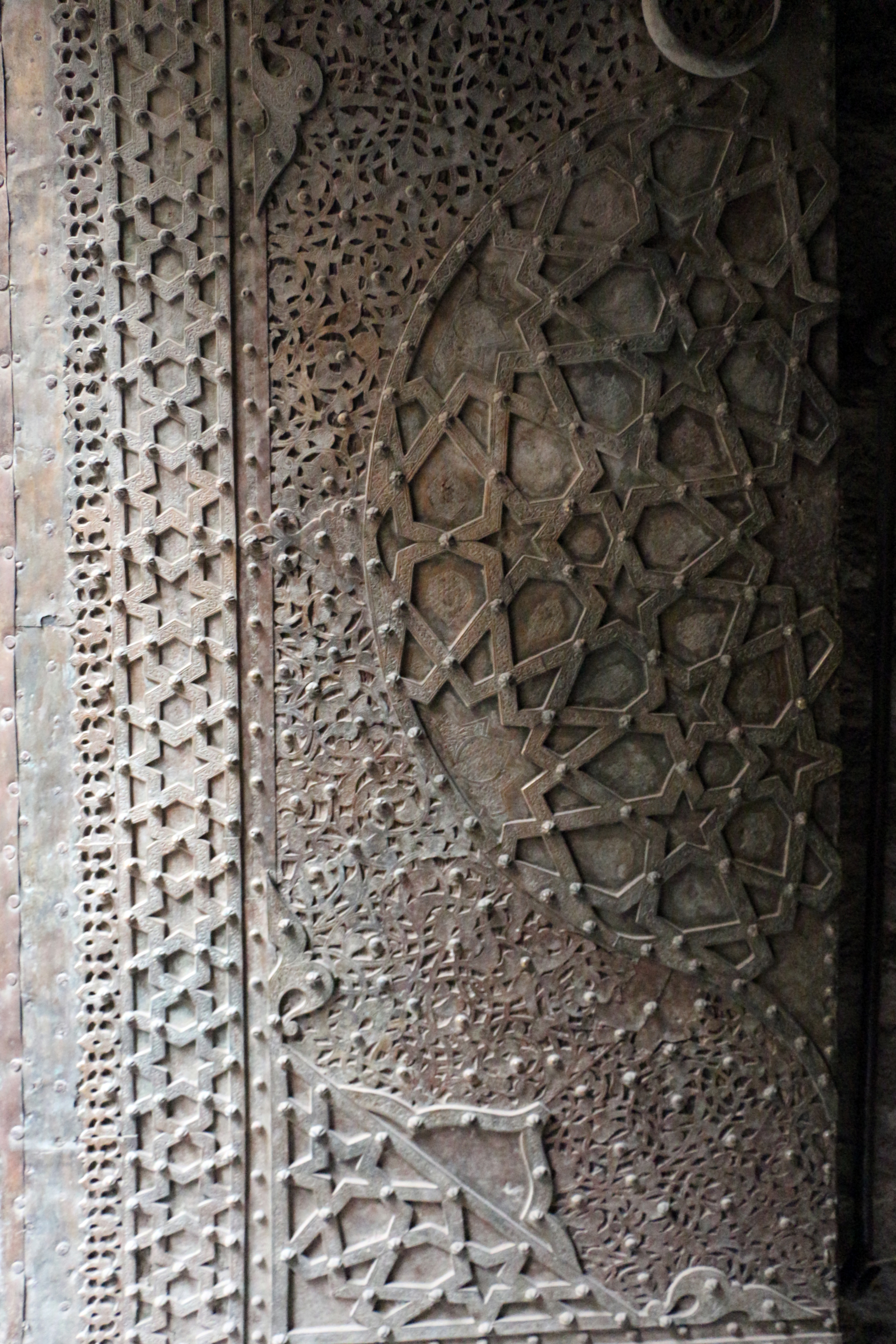
The mosque's metal doors, with geometric and arabesque patterns

== See also ==
- Islam in Egypt
- List of mosques in Egypt
- Late medieval domes
