= Khayamiya =

Egyptian decorative art appliqué textile

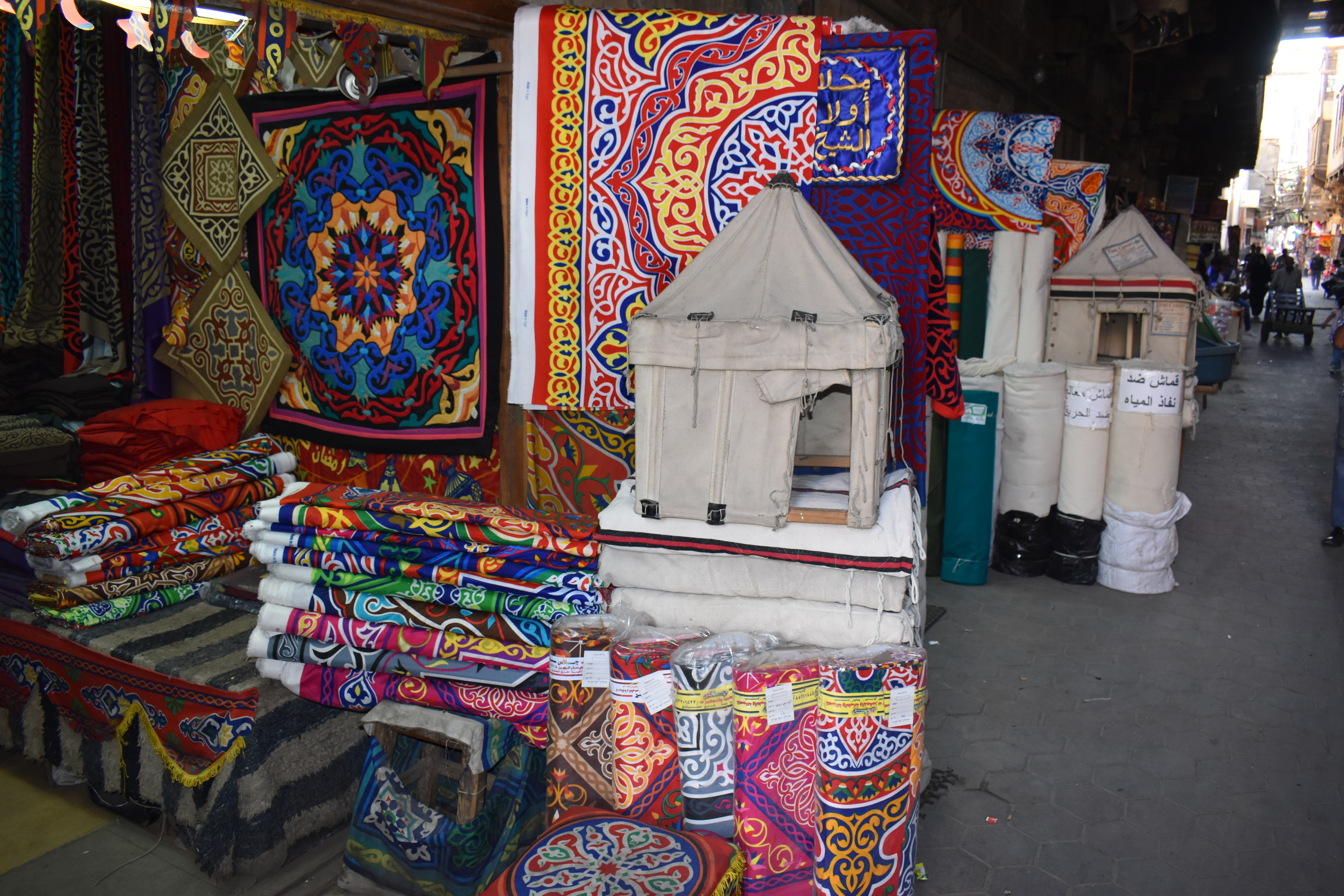
Khayamiya in Cairo

Khayamiya (Egyptian Arabic: خيّامية khayyāmiyah) is a decorative Egyptian art appliqué textile, that dates back to as far as Ancient Egypt. They are now primarily made in Cairo, Egypt, along what is known as the Street of the Tentmakers (Shari'a al-Khayamiyya, or Suq al-Khayamiyya) centered in the Qasaba of Radwan Bey, a historic covered market built in the 17th century. The street is located immediately south of bawabet el metwali (Bab Zuwayla), and is located along the historic economic axis of Cairo, in a section within Muizz street.

== Description ==
Khayamiya are elaborately patterned and colourful appliqués applied to the interior of tents, serving a dual function of shelter and ornament. They resemble quilts, and possess the three layers typical of quilts – a heavy "back", a background "top", and elaborate appliqué over the "top". Functionally, they can be compared to curtains, though their recent roles have diversified to cater for touristic purposes. These now include cushion covers, fashion, bags, bedspreads, and other applications.

== Design ==
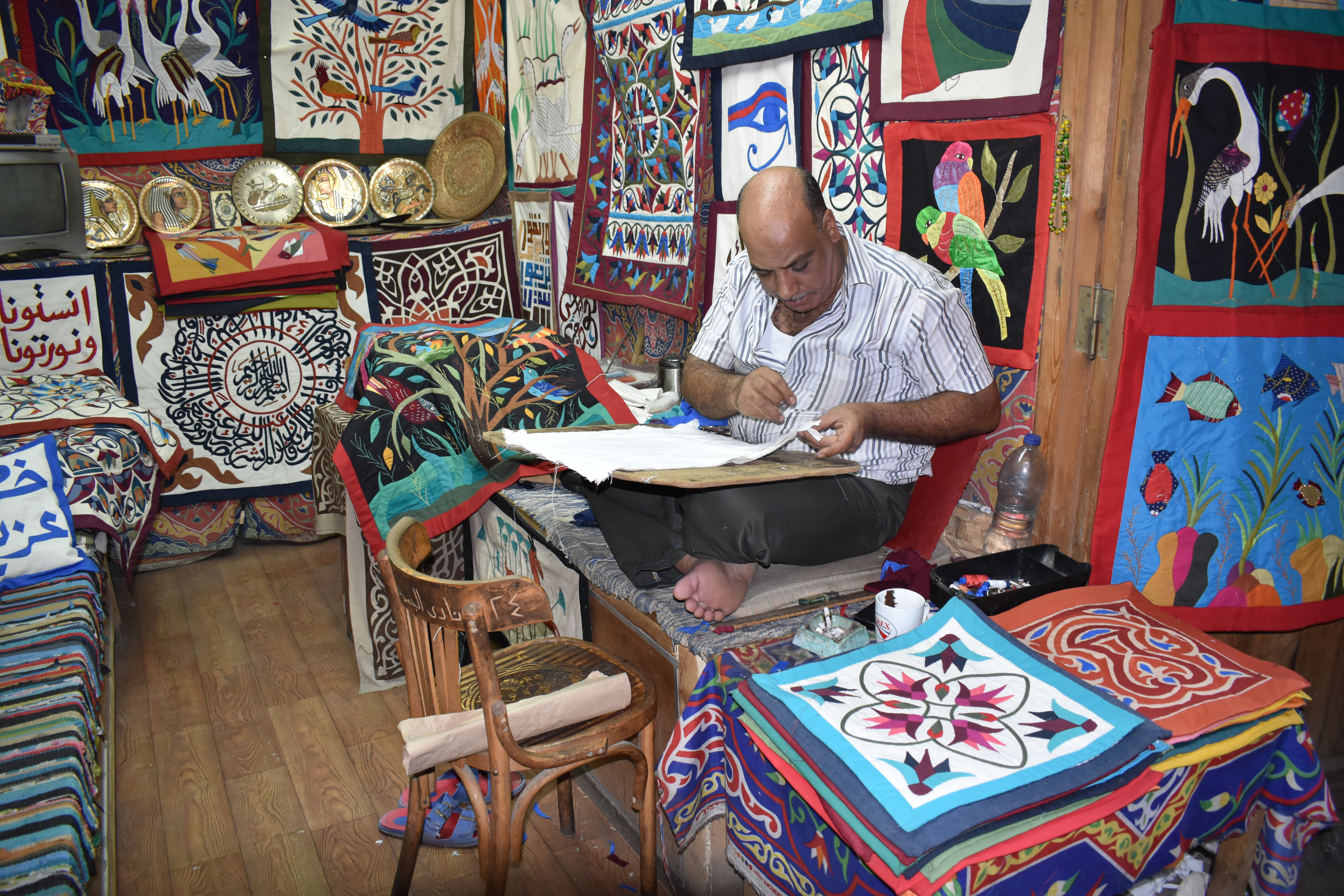
Tentmaker

Khayamiya features hand-stitched cotton appliqué over a heavy cotton back. This back is intended to be protective and durable against a hot, dry, and dusty climate. The hand-stitching is performed quickly by skilled tentmakers while seated cross-legged, using needles and thread. Small pieces of fabric are cut to size as they are required using large scissors. Khayamiya are usually completed by a single tentmaker regardless of the size of the piece. These can range from basic cushion covers to intricate whole-wall hangings several metres across. Large projects can subsequently take several months to complete. The tentmakers are very protective of their creative innovations, as successful new designs are often copied by their competitive neighbours.

Popular design motifs include geometric and curvilinear arabesque patterns derived from Islamic ornaments, and scenes inspired by Pharaonic art, especially papyrus and lotus motifs. Egyptian folkloric subjects such as Goha, Nubian musicians, and the whirling dervishes are popular touristic souvenirs, as are stylised depictions of fish and birds. Calligraphic patterns, based upon texts from the Qur'an, are often shaped into objects and animals. Khedival panels made in the late nineteenth and early twentieth century typically feature larger blocks of appliqué and wider stitching, though touristic and contemporary khayamiya feature finer and more elaborate handwork.

== Terminology ==
The correct spelling is in Arabic, but English approximations of this term are diverse, including khiamiah, khiyamiya, khiamiyya, khyamiyya, kheyyemiah, kheyameya, and khayyāmia. The Arabic word khayma (خيمة), meaning "tent", is linked to the Persian khayyām (خیام), which means "tentmaker". Popular alternative descriptions in English include the "work of the Tentmakers of Cairo", "tentmaker appliqué" or simply "Egyptian appliqué". Medhat Adel Emam has discussed the origin of the term as it applies to distinctly Egyptian Arabic with Turkish influences. Very large decorated khayamiya "pavilions" are known as suradeq.

== Historic khayamiya ==
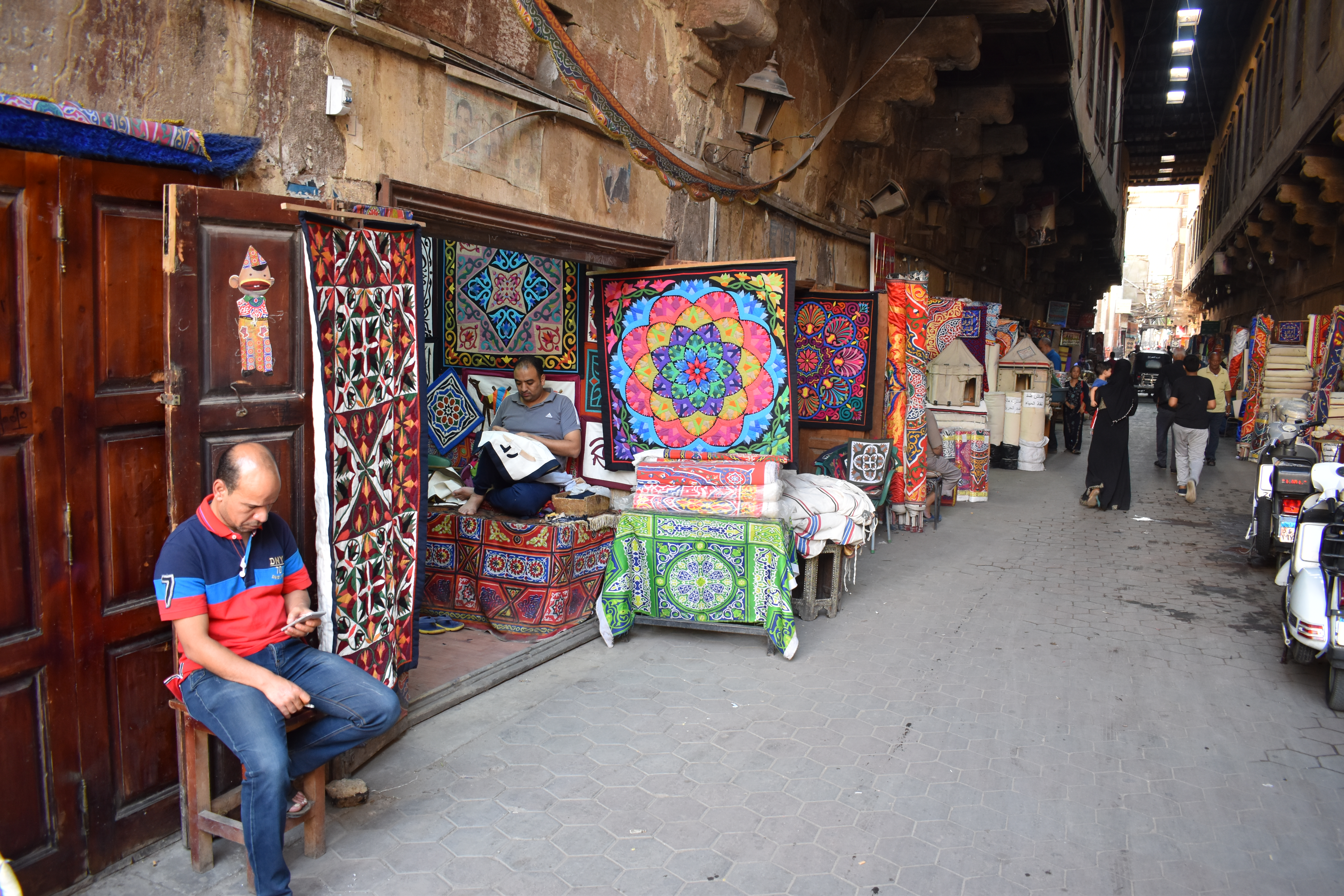
Street of the Tentmakers in the historic Qasaba of Radwan Bey, a 17th-century covered market.

Historic specimens of khayamiya are rare. They were originally made to be placed outside in dry heat and dust, and were regarded as replaceable – hence not highly valued for collection or preservation. Khedival examples are held in the collection of several museums, including the British Museum. There are also references to khayamiya in photographic records and European orientalist paintings from the nineteenth century and earlier. Literary references to their use, including illustrations, can be seen in medieval manuscripts. There is archaeological evidence to suggest that textiles comparable to khayamiya have been created and used in Egypt since the Pharaonic era.

Despite their historic legacy, the tentmaker occupation is now endangered. This is largely due to competition from imported mass-printed fabrics bearing similar decorative patterns. These printed sheets are now widely used across Egypt as temporary screens for special events, notably during Ramadan, festivals, weddings, and funerals, in place of the original handmade khayamiya. The majority of khayamiya created in recent years are marketed to tourists visiting Egypt. In the 2000s, the first international exhibitions of Egyptian khayamiya were held in Australia, the UK, France, and the USA. These were curated by Jenny Bowker, an Australian quiltmaker and teacher.

== Khayamiya in contemporary art ==
The Egyptian artist Moataz Nasr features khayamiya-inspired aspects in his contemporary mixed-media artwork. Susan Hefuna's installation "I Love Egypt!" (featured in the 18th Biennale of Sydney in 2012) also applies Khayamiya within the context of contemporary installation art. From 2009, the Egyptian artist Hani el-Masri collaborated with the Tentmakers to produce a 5 m × 8 m (16 ft × 26 ft) interpretation of the One Thousand and One Nights. The Algerian artist Rachid Koraïchi has also collaborated with the Tentmakers of Cairo to create large calligraphic banners, such as his Invisible Masters series. As Koraïchi stated in 2011:

"When we talk about an Islamic craft tradition, we're not talking about the art of the 19th century that took place in an artist's studio and on canvas. Here we're talking about things that come out of everyday life... It's not a world in which the artist lives apart."
The culture of the artisan – still present, but steadily disappearing in the streets of Koraichi's native Algeria and surrounding Maghreb countries – offers an insight into how art can be drawn directly from a day-to-day world, yet heightened by the dedication of craft. "If you look at the foundations of western art," Koraichi continued, "it was based on a whole tradition of craft that went into churches; the goblets made by metalworkers and the marbling. It's exactly the same with mosques, in that they were built by those who could work with stone and weaving. These are sources that we can clearly see but the question we have is how to take those disappearing traditions and make them present again in the living moment."

== Styles ==
There are four main forms of Khayamiya: Khedival, Touristic, Street, and Contemporary.

- Khedival khayamiya were made between 1867 and 1914. These are usually large appliqued panels in indigo, red, and white on beige canvas, often featuring vertical blue stripes in the canvas itself.
- Touristic khayamiya were made from the 1890s through to the present day, and were notably popular after the discovery of Tutankhamun's tomb in 1922. These are often smaller, and are figurative appliques, usually featuring motifs from ancient Egypt or what were then contemporary scenes of Egyptian life, especially folkloric scenes. They were generally purchased by international travelers to Egypt as popular Egyptian souvenirs.
- Street khayamiya include panels made for outdoor use within Egypt, such as suradeq pavilions or backdrops for public events. These are large scale "architectural" textiles. In the 20th century the average size of a panel was 2.75 by 5.57 metres (9.0 by 18.3 ft). Many panels were tied together on a wooden structure to form a fabric pavilion.
- Contemporary khayamiya are appliqué panels made for indoor use.

Contemporary khaymiya can be divided into the following sub-genres:

- Arabesque khayamiya, consisting of elaborate interlinked patterns. This genre dominates this contemporary art form.
- Folkloric khayamiya, such as the legends of Goha.
- Orientalist khayamiya, such as street scenes based on prints by David Roberts, or their actual equivalents located in Cairo.
- Bird khayamiya, often associated with the tree of life, the Garden of Eden, or Pharaonic tomb painting
- Musicians performing traditional Egyptian or Nubian musical instruments and dances.
- Calligraphy usually based on the Qur'an.
- Pharaonic designs based on papyrus texts from the Book of the Dead and other ancient Egyptian art.
- Commissioned including unique pieces made at the request of artists, designers, curators, and publishers.
- Neo-Khedival panels inspired by the historic appliqués of the Khedival period (1867–1914). These started to emerge after 2014, following the publication of Khedival khayamiya in textile journals.

== Gallery ==
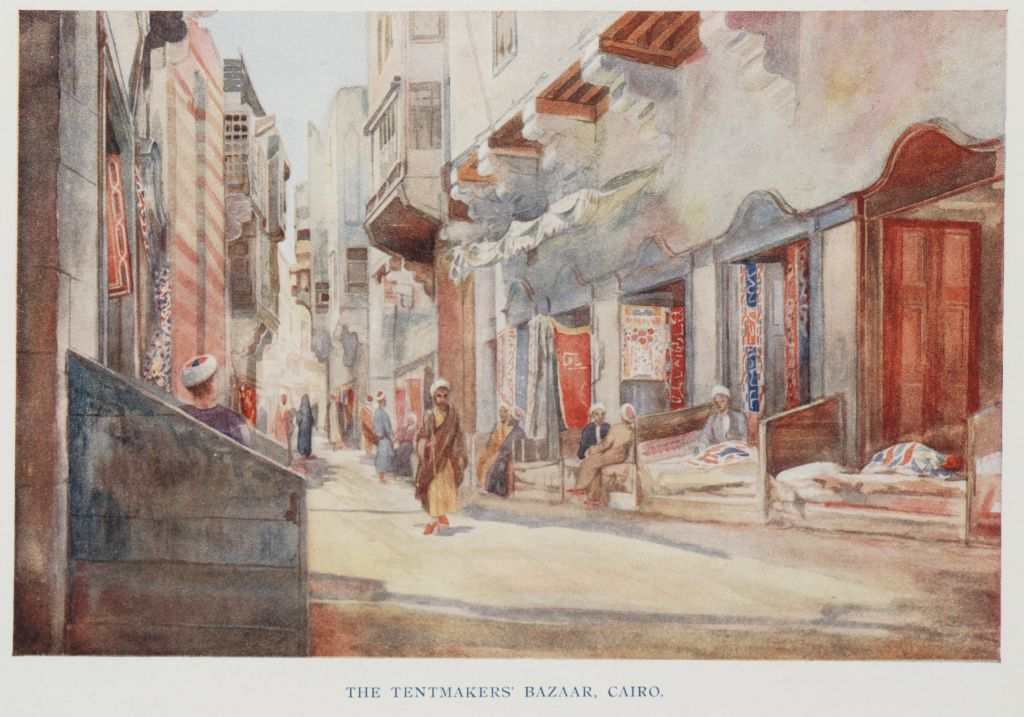
The Street of the Tentmakers in Cairo as seen in 1907 by Walter S.S. Tyrwhitt

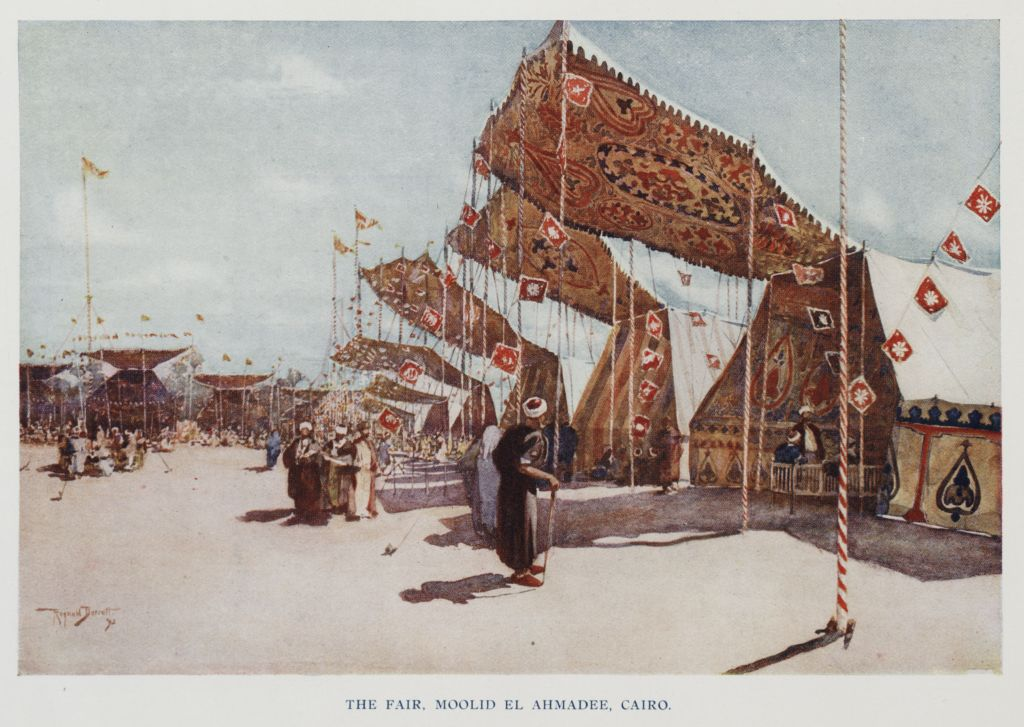
Festival tents (for Maulid Ahmadi) in Cairo featuring khayamiya, as depicted by Reginald Barratt in 1907

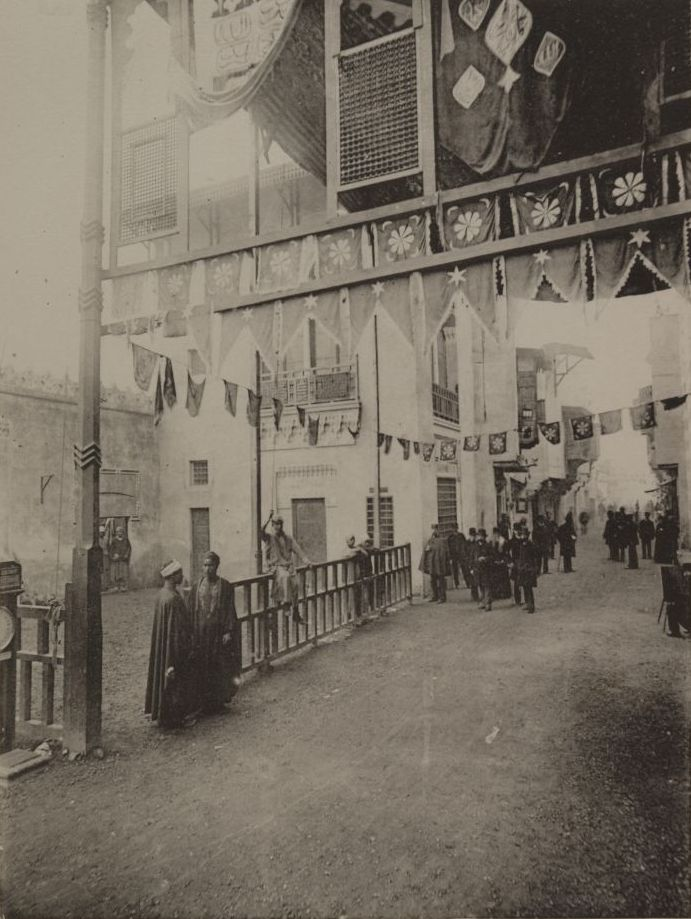
Photograph of a street entrance in Cairo by Delort Gléon from 1889, showing the use of khayamiya as a street ornament

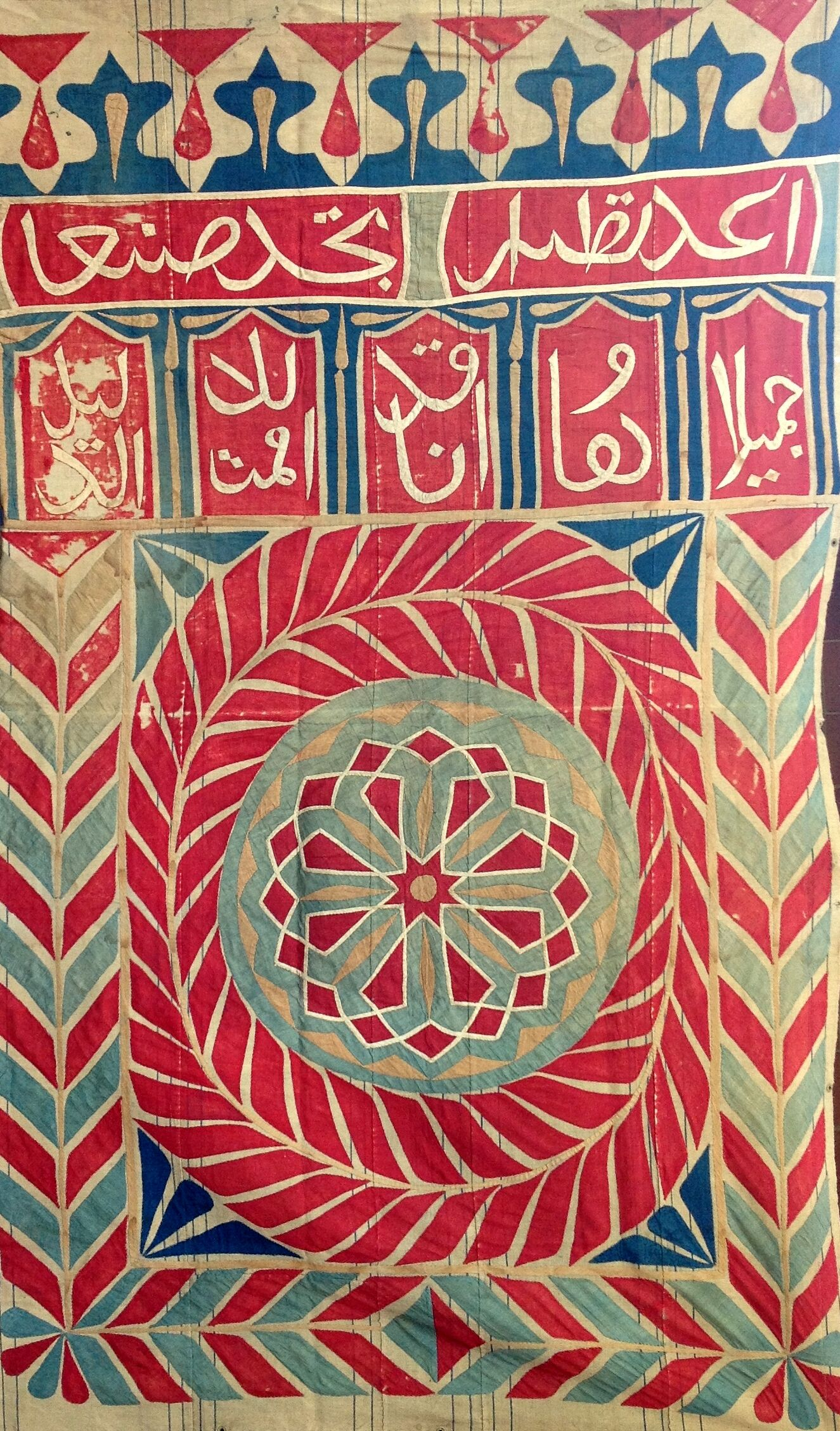
A vernacular example of Khedival khayamiya, circa 1880–1900

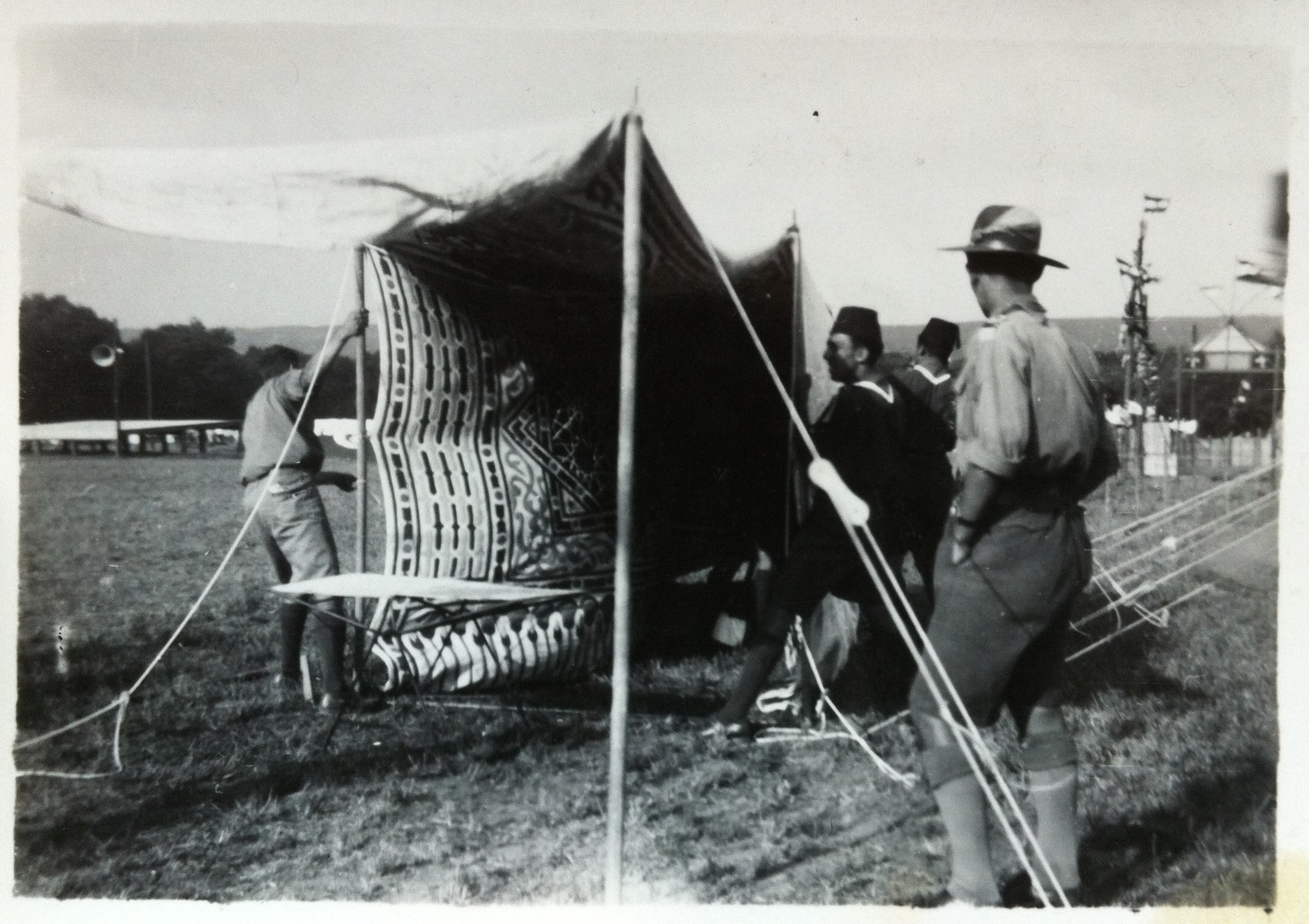
Egyptian scouts raising a decorated khayamiya tent at the 4th World Scout Jamboree in Budapest, Hungary in 1933

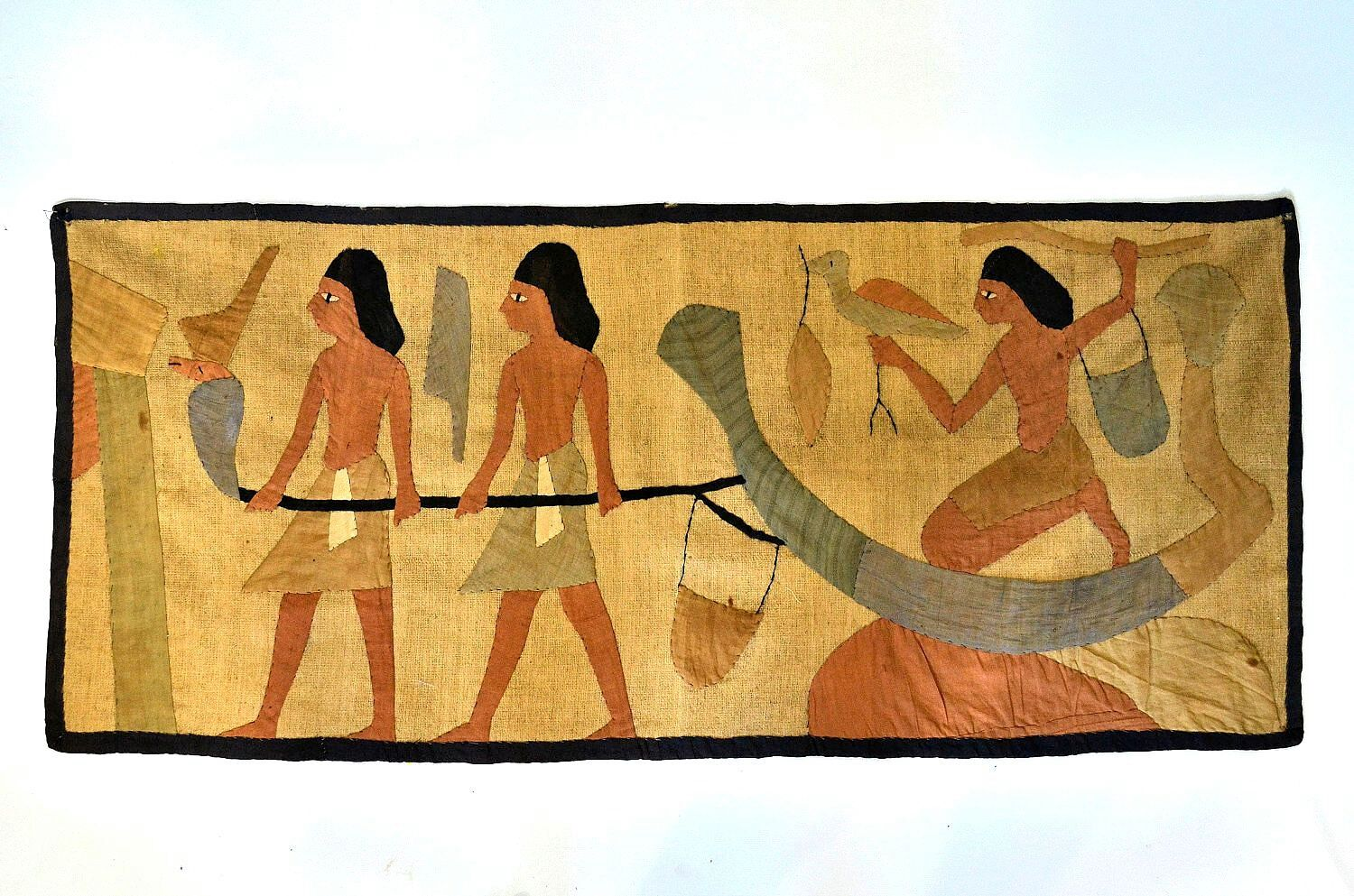
Touristic khayamiya: Egyptian boatmen circa 1910–1925

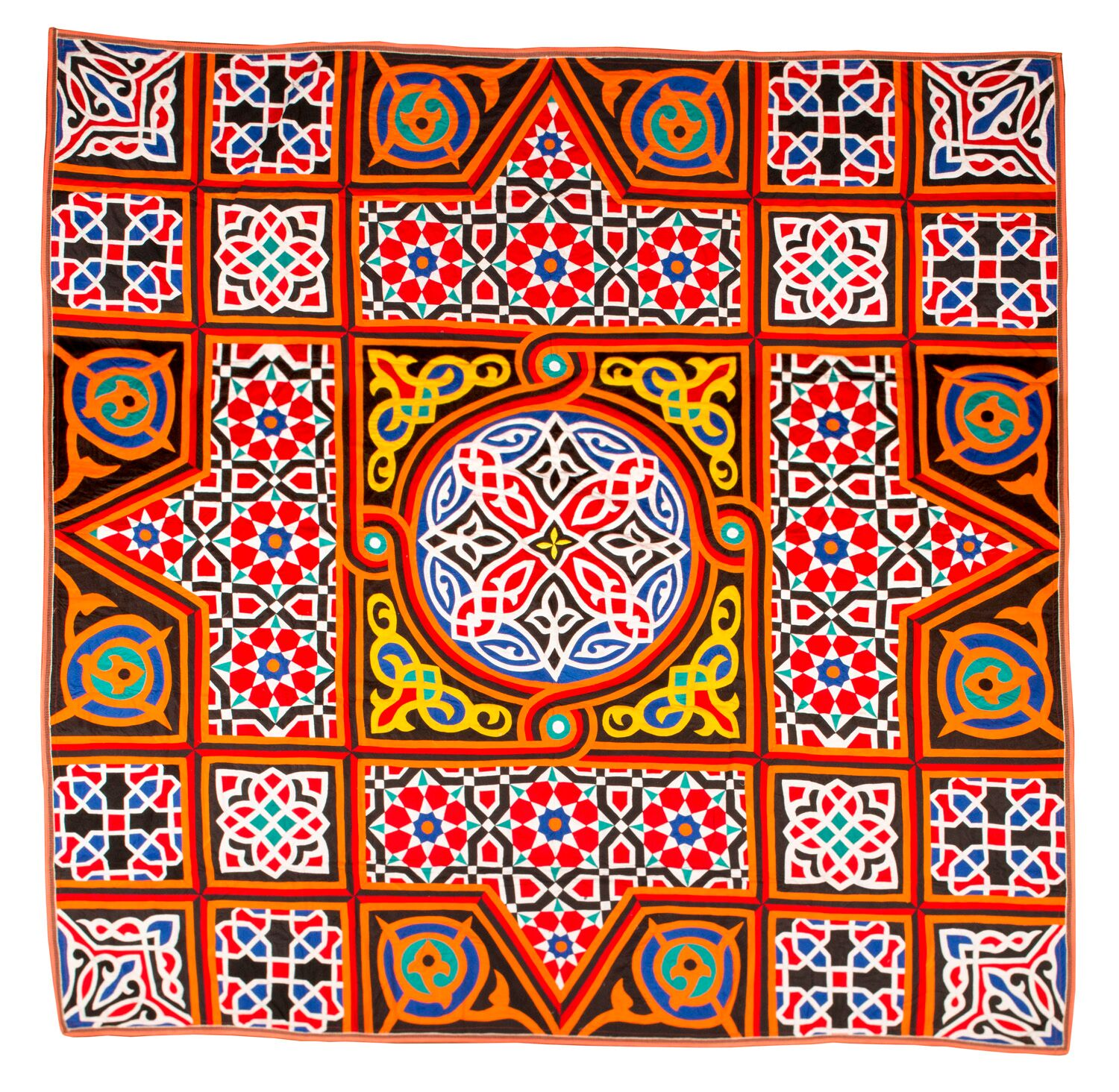
Egyptian khayamiya: a typical "street panel" design by the tentmakers of Cairo, circa 1970–2000

== See also ==
- Khayyam
