= List of buildings in Cairo =

This is a list of buildings in Cairo, Egypt.

== Ancient sites and monuments ==
- Giza Pyramids
- Senusret I Obelisk (Heliopolis Obelisk)

== Museums ==
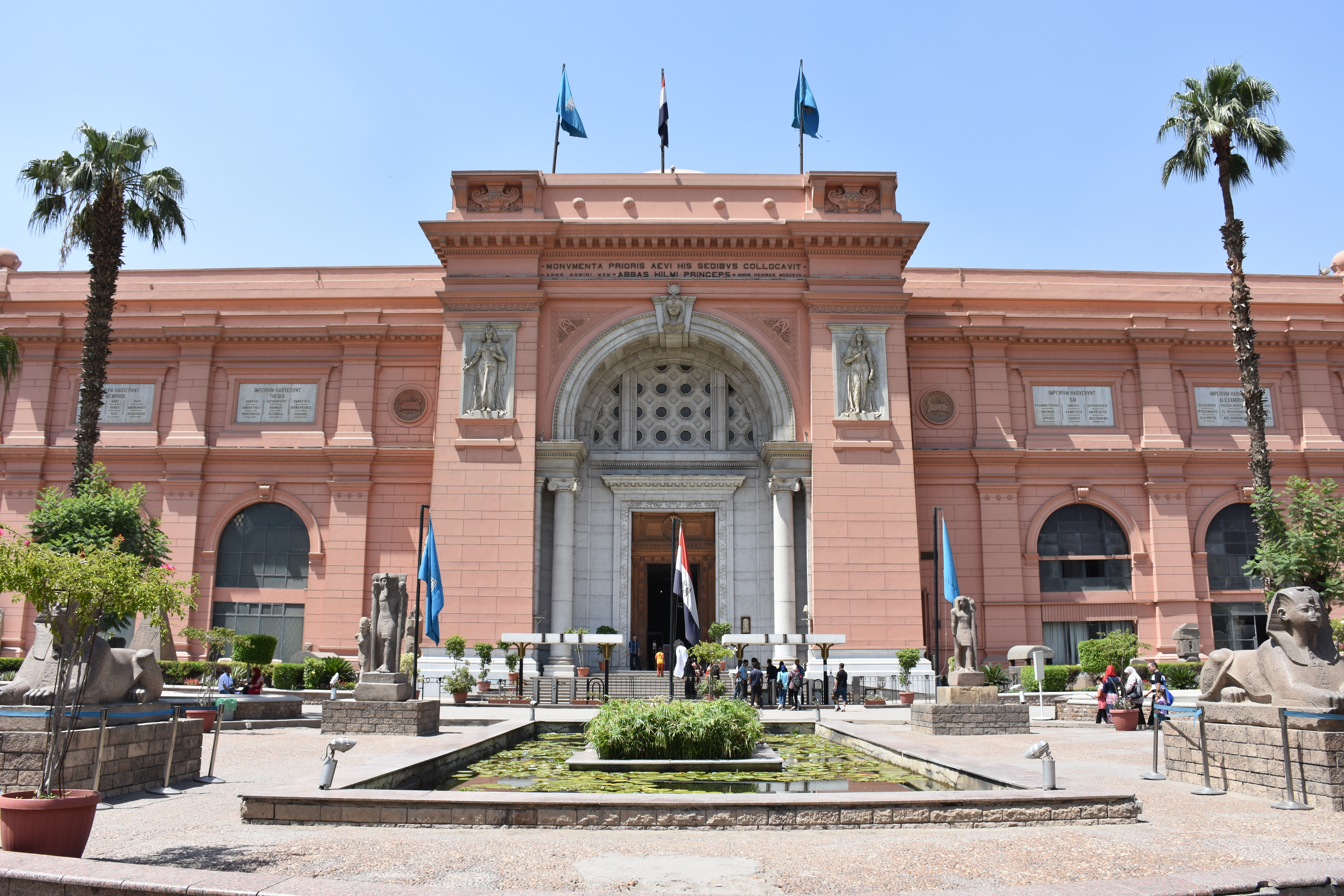
The Egyptian Museum

- Grand Egyptian Museum
- Egyptian Museum
- Museum of Egyptian Civilization
- Coptic Museum
- Museum of Fine Arts
- Alexandria National Museum
- Museum of Islamic Art
- Luxor Museum
- Museum of Islamic Ceramics
- Gayer-Anderson Museum
- Mostafa Kamel Museum
- Nubian Museum
- Museum of Tell El Basta
- Museum of Modern Art

== Religious buildings ==
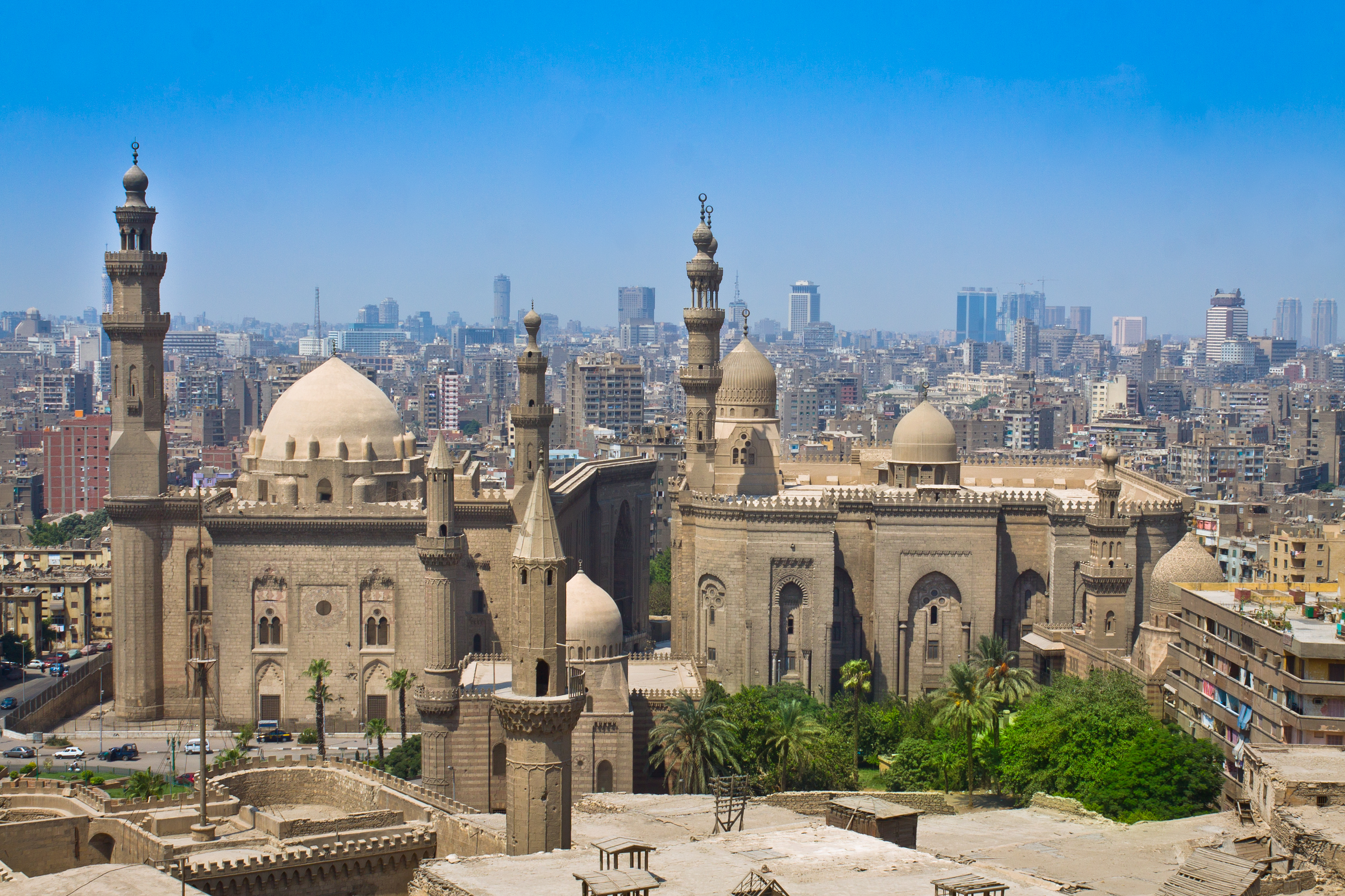
The Madrasa-Mosque of Sultan Hasan (left) and the al-Rifa'i Mosque (right)

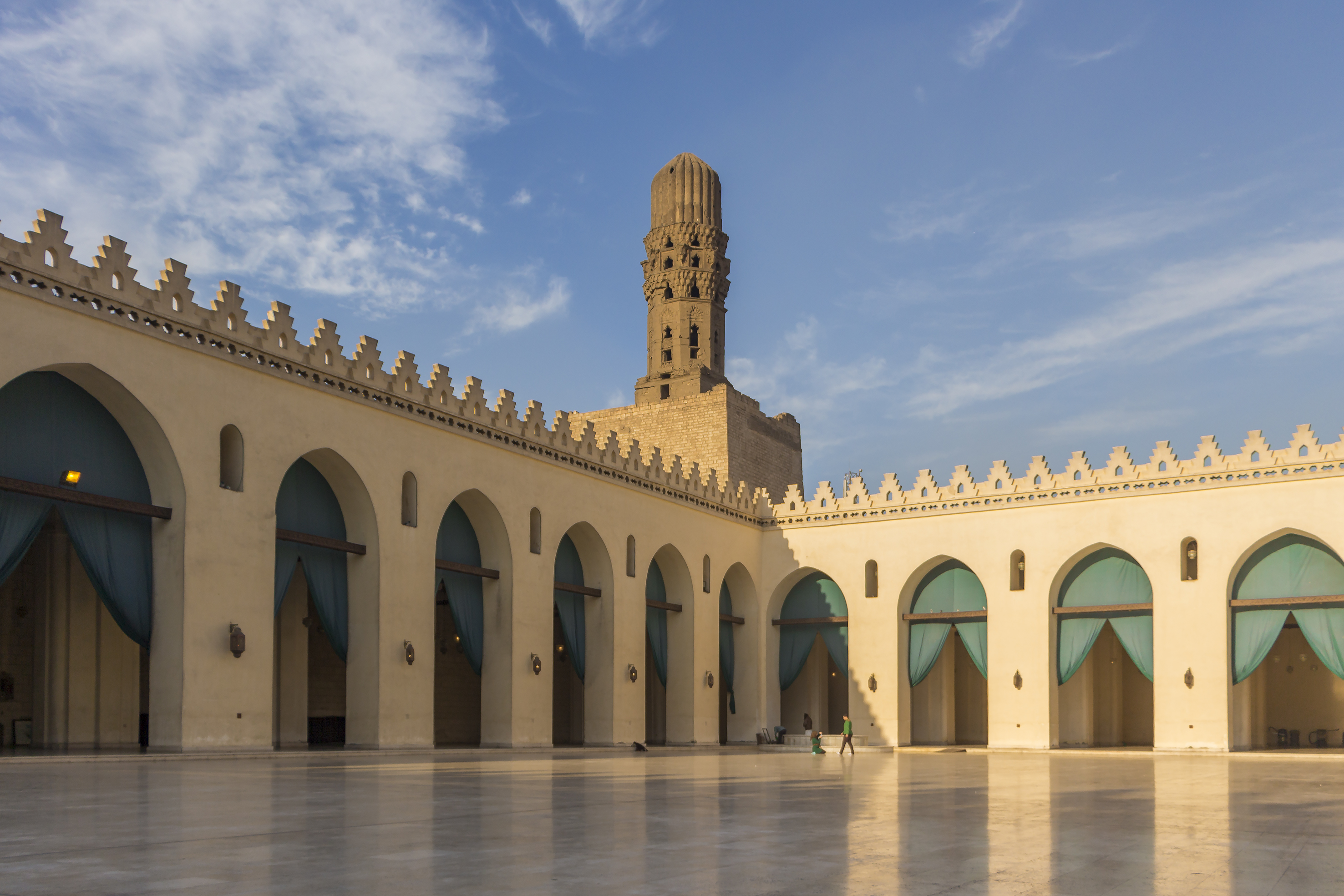
Al-Hakim Mosque

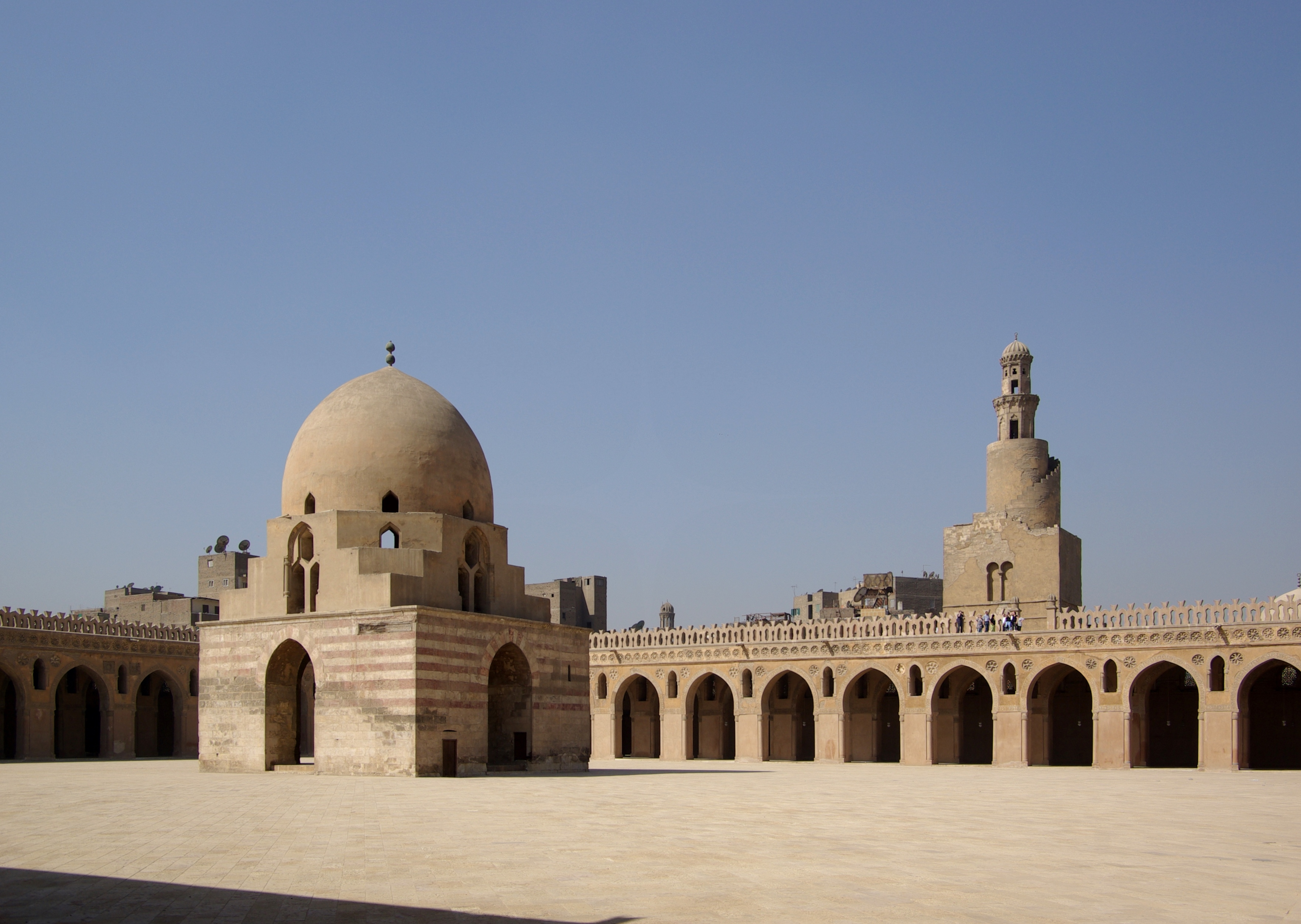
Ibn Tulun Mosque

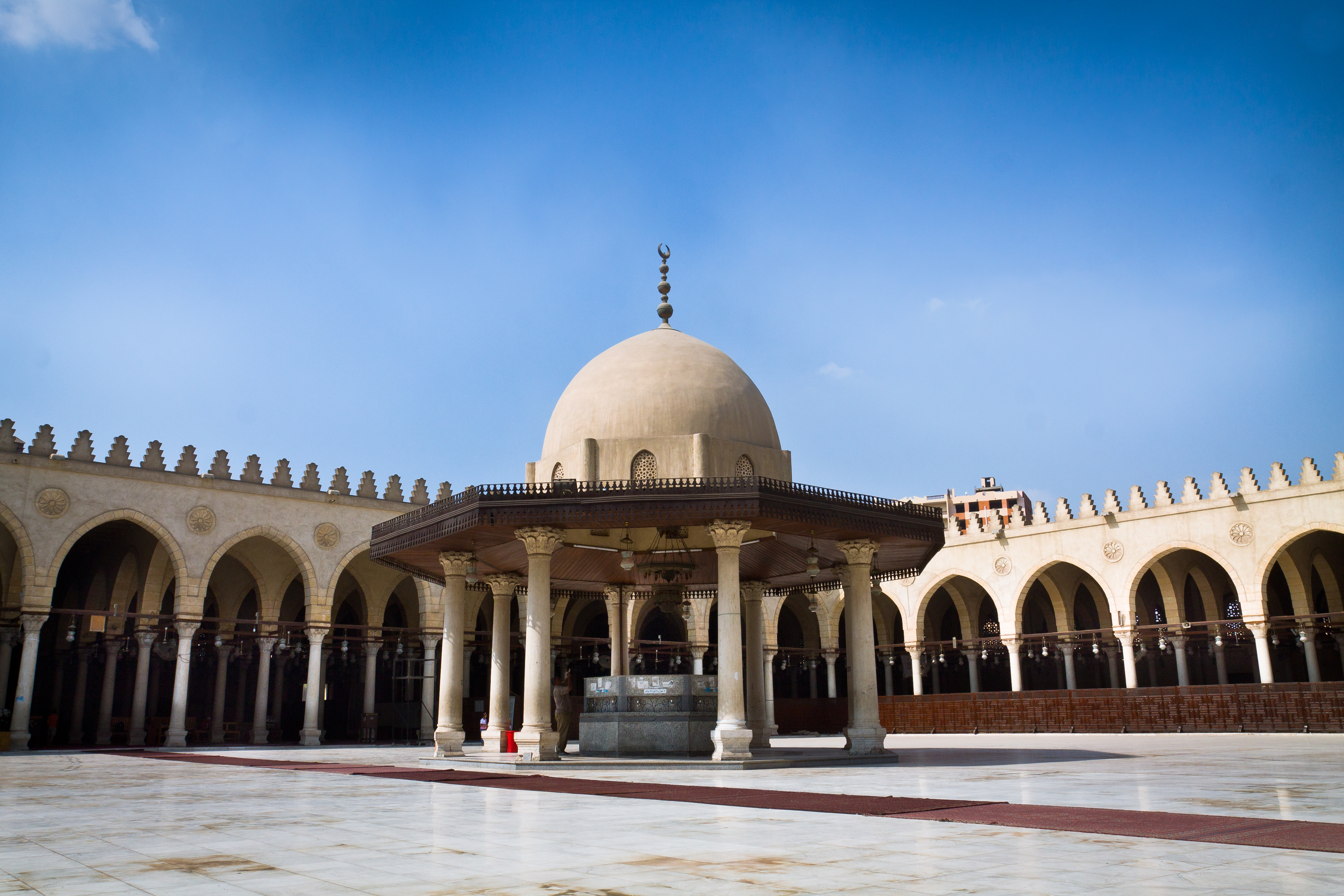
Mosque of Amr ibn al-As

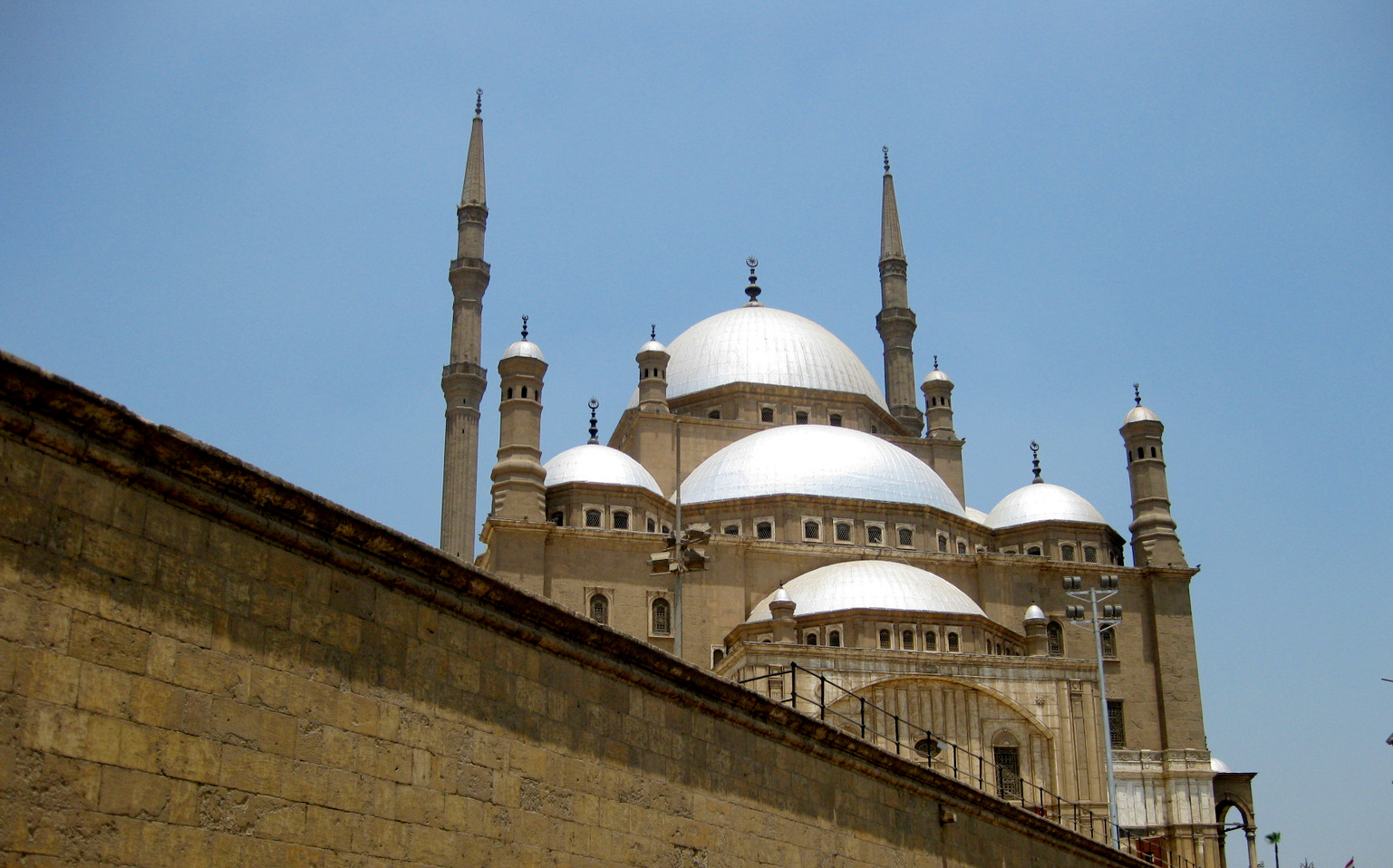
Mosque of Muhammad Ali

Muslim

- Abu al-'Ila Mosque
- Al-Azhar Mosque
- Al-Hakim Mosque
- Al-Hussein Mosque
- Al-Rifa'i Mosque
- Aqmar Mosque
- Aqsunqur Mosque (Blue Mosque)
- Demerdash Mosque
- Ibn Tulun Mosque
- Juyushi Mosque
- Khanqah of Baybars II
- Khanqah of Faraj ibn Barquq
- Khanqah-Mausoleum of Sultan al-Ashraf Barsbay
- Lulua Mosque
- Madrasa of Umm al-Sultan Sha'ban
- Madrasa of Amir Sunqur Sa'di (Mausoleum of Hasan Sadaqa, Mawlawiyya Museum)
- Mashhad of Sayyida Ruqayya
- Mausoleum of Imam al-Shafi'i
- Mausoleum of Tarabay al-Sharifi
- Mosque of Amir al-Sayf Sarghatmish
- Mosque and Khanqah of Shaykhu
- Mosque and Mausoleum of Sultan Qaytbay
- Mosque and Mausoleum of Amir Khayrbak
- Mosque of Abu Dahab
- Mosque of al-Burdayni
- Mosque of al-Nasir Muhammad
- Mosque of al-Salih Tala'i
- Mosque of al-Zahir Baybars
- Mosque of Amir al-Maridani
- Mosque of Amr ibn al-As
- Mosque of Khushqadam El-Ahmadi
- Mosque of Muhammad Ali
- Mosque of Qani-Bay
- Mosque of Qanibay al-Muhammadi
- Mosque of Qijmas al-Ishaqi
- Mosque of Sultan al-Muayyad
- Mosque of Taghribirdi
- Mosque-Madrasa of Sultan al-Ashraf Barsbay
- Mosque-Madrasa of Sultan Barquq
- Mosque-Madrasa of Sultan Hassan
- Qarafa Mosque
- Qubbat Afandina
- Rabaa Al-Adawiya Mosque
- Sayida Aisha Mosque
- Sayida Nafisa Mosque
- Sayida Zaynab Mosque
- Sultaniyya Mausoleum
- Tomb of Salar and Sangar-al-Gawli

Christian

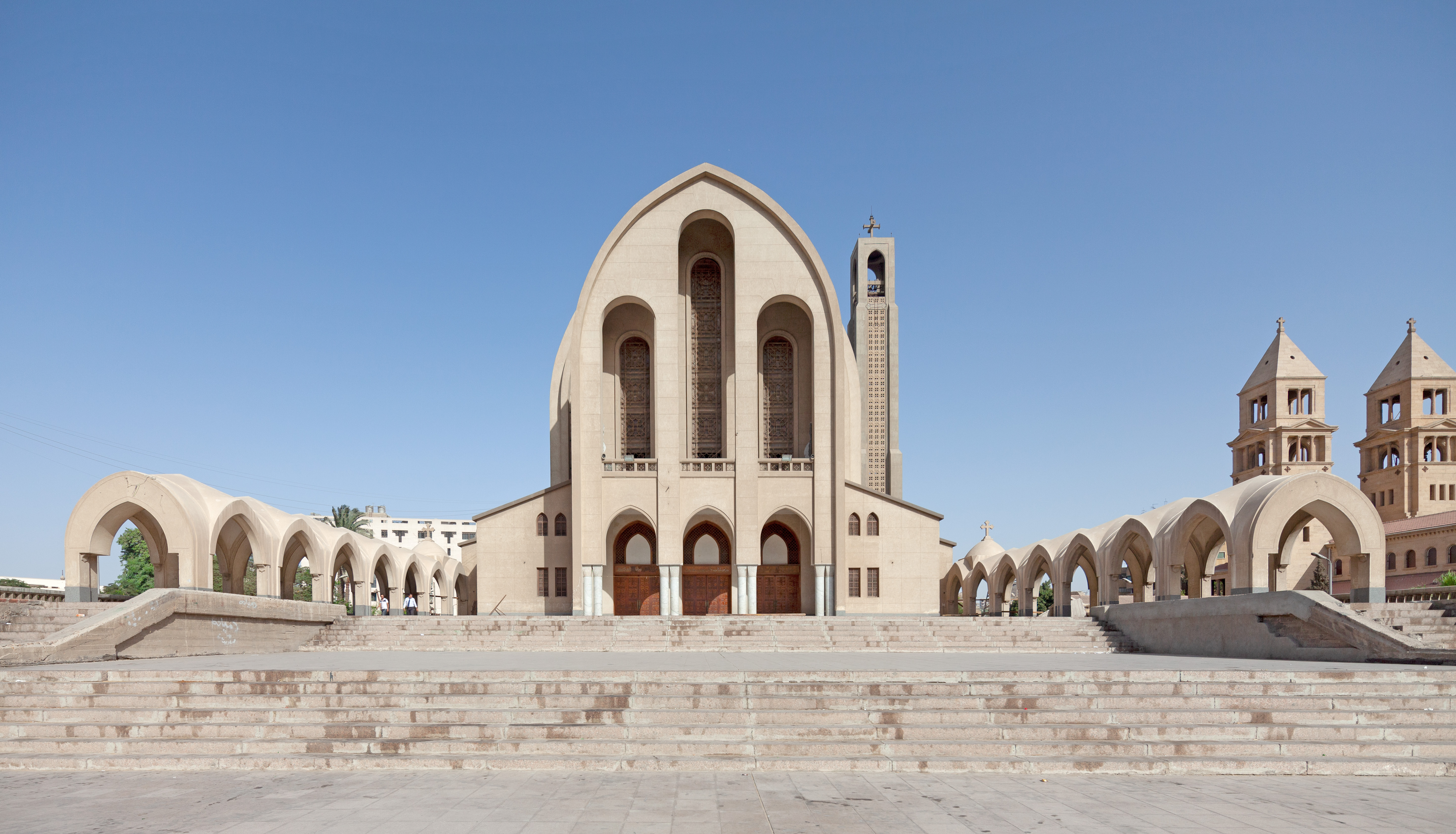
The Saint Mark's Coptic Orthodox Cathedral

- All Saints' Cathedral (Anglican / Episcopal)
- Basilica of St Therese of the Child Jesus (Roman Catholic)
- Cathedral of Our Lady of Fatima (Chaldean Catholic)
- Church of St George (Greek Orthodox)
- Church of the Virgin Mary (Haret Zuweila)
- Maadi Community Church
- Saint Mark's Coptic Orthodox Cathedral
- Saint Mary Church (Haret Elroum)
- St Andrew's United Church
- The Hanging Church

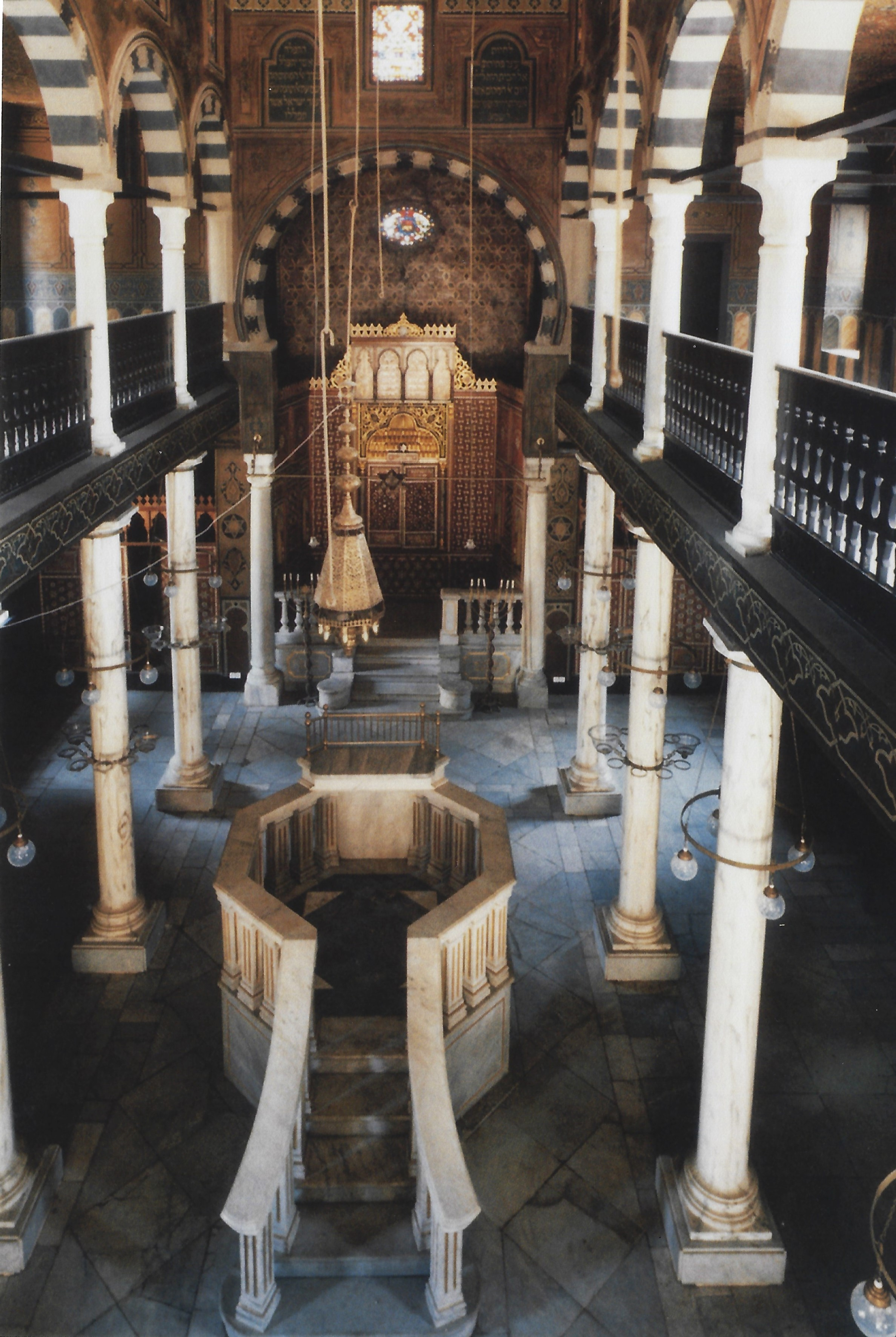
Interior of the Ben Ezra Synagogue

Jewish

- Ben Ezra Synagogue
- Ets Hayim Synagogue
- Haïm Capoussi Synagogue
- Maimonides Synagogue
- Moussa Dar'i Synagogue (Karaite)
- Sha'ar Hashamayim Synagogue
- Vitali Madjar Synagogue

== Palaces, historic mansions, and villas in Cairo ==
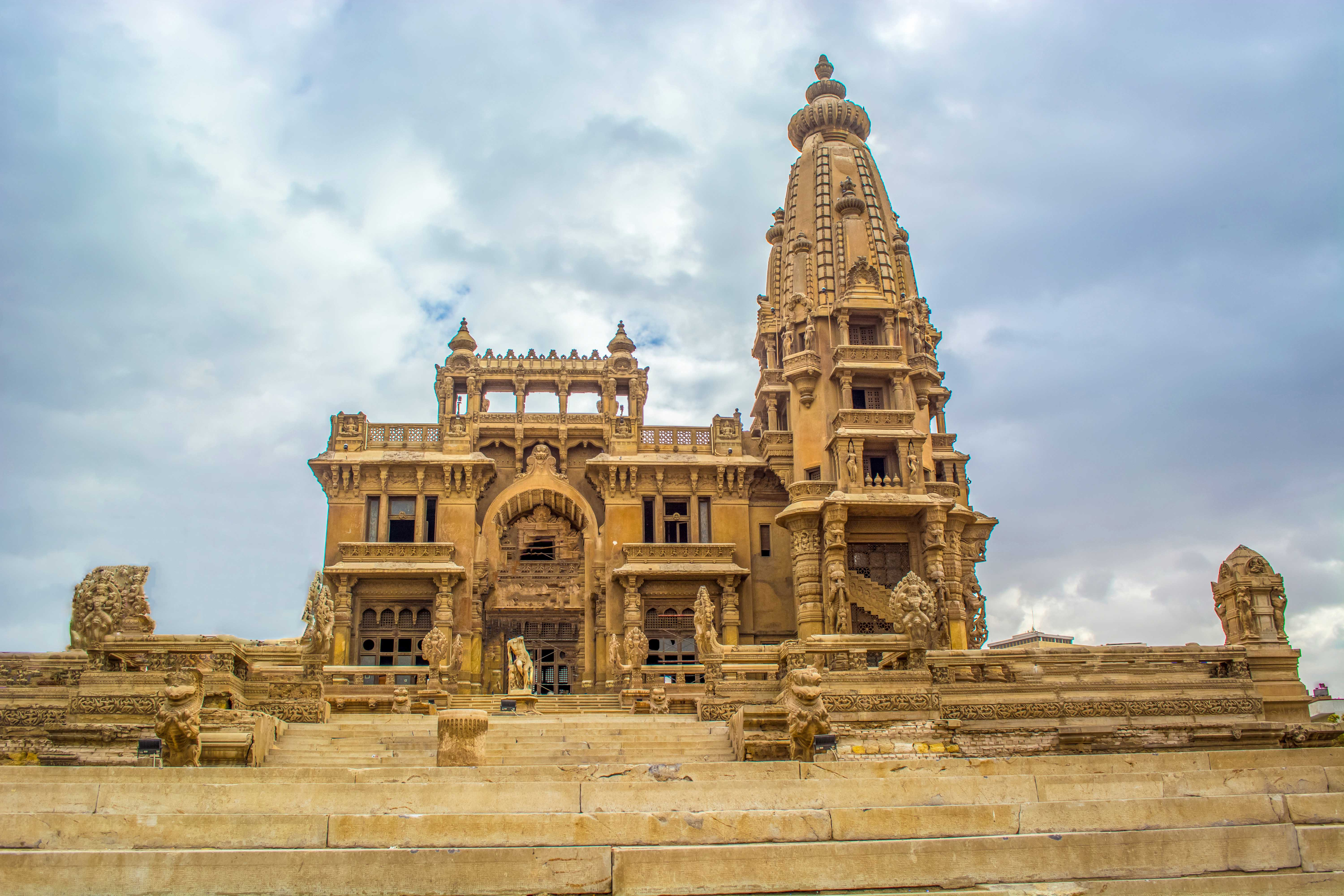
The Baron Empain Palace

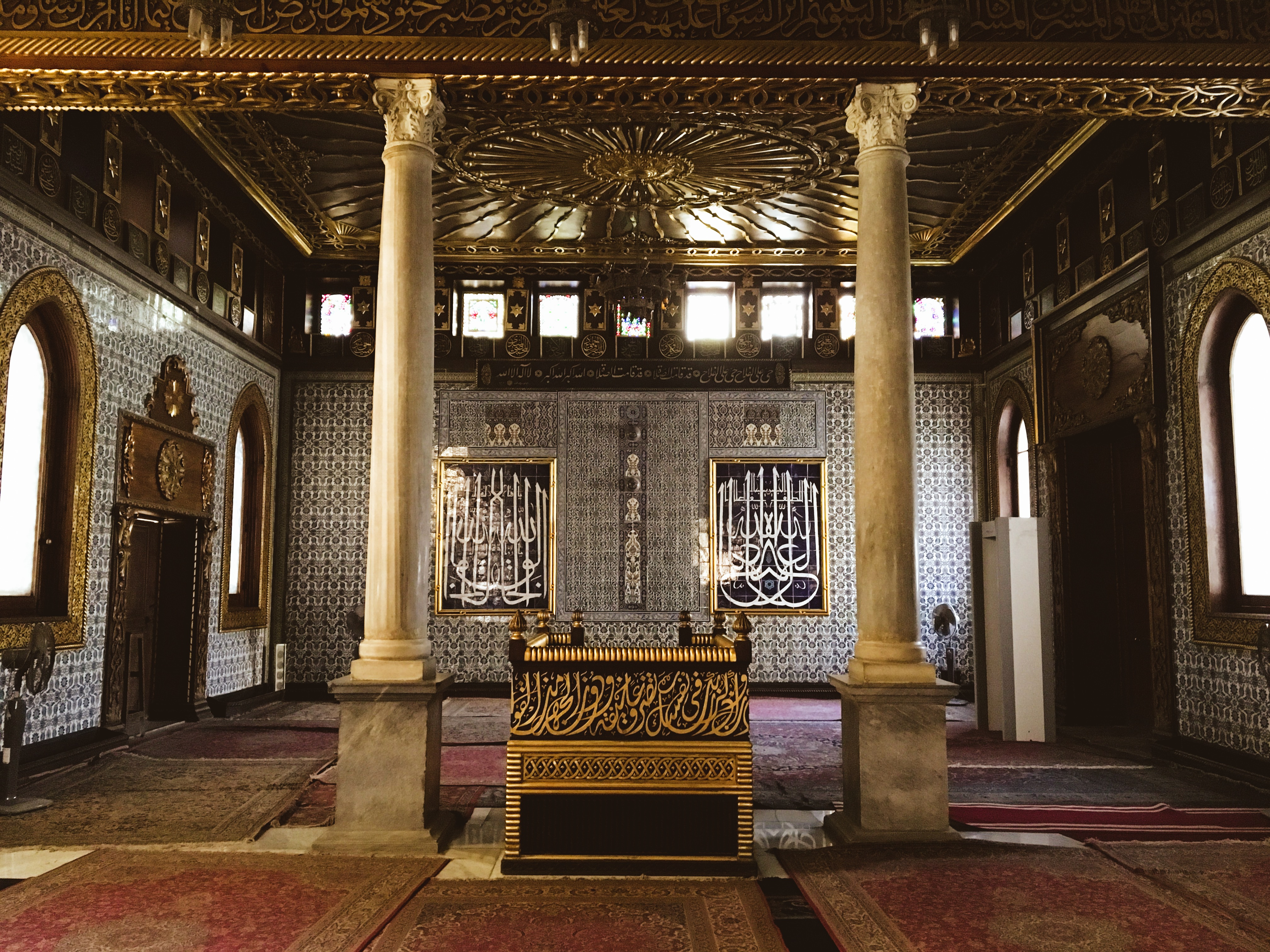
Interior of Al-Manyal Palace

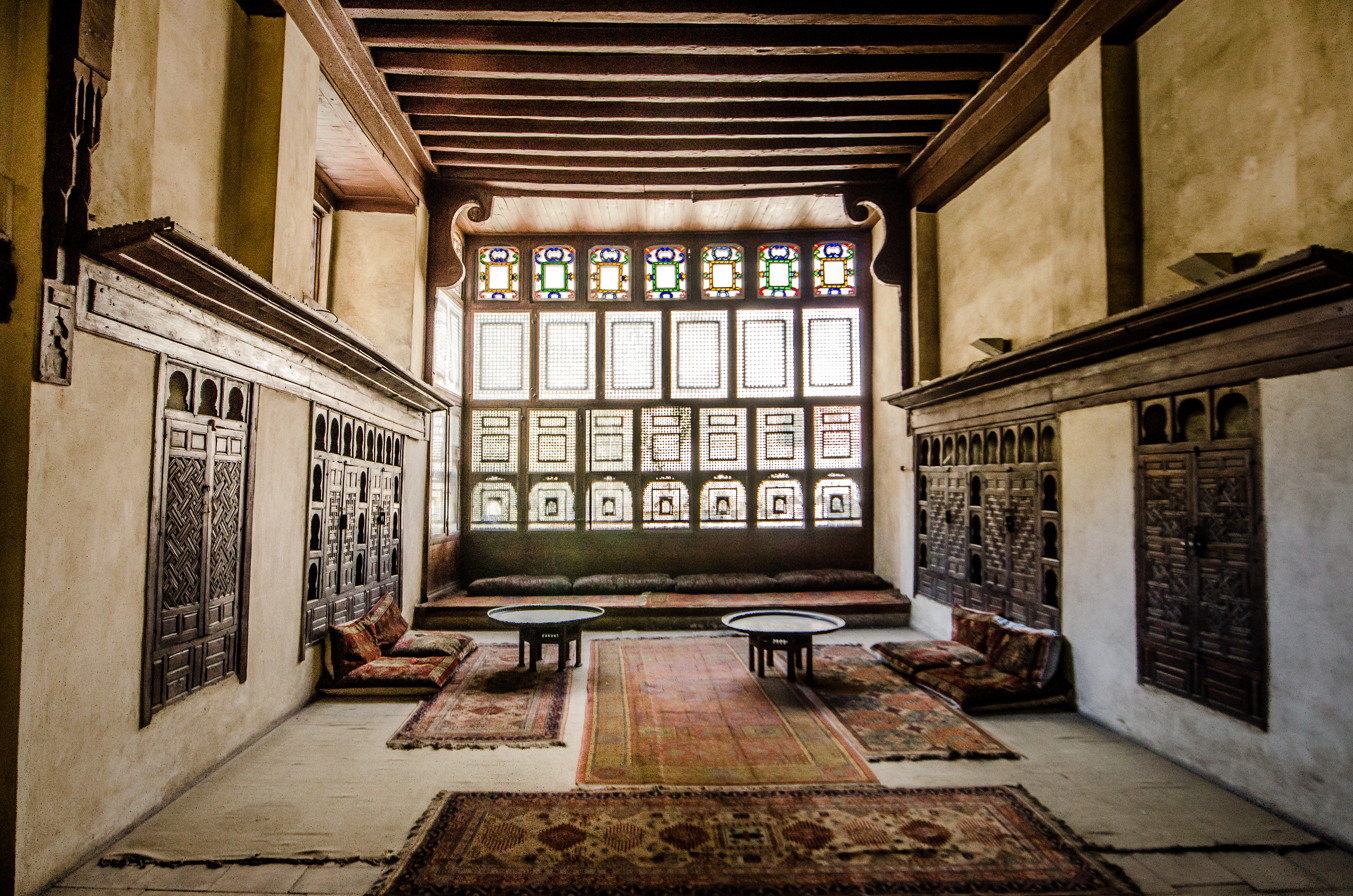
Bayt al-Suhaymi

- Abdeen Palace
- Al-Gawhara Palace
- Amir Alin Aq Palace
- Amir Taz Palace
- Baron Empain Palace
- Bayt al-Kritliyya (Gayer-Anderson Museum)
- Bayt Al-Razzaz palace
- Bayt al-Sinnari
- Bayt Al-Suhaymi
- Beshtak Palace
- Dubara Palace
- Gezirah Palace
- Heliopolis Palace
- Khairy Pasha Palace
- Koubbeh Palace
- Manial Palace and Museum
- Manasterly Palace
- Palace of Yashbak
- Prince Amr Ibrahim Palace
- Tahra Palace
- Tara
- Zaafarana palace

== Historic fortresses and gates ==
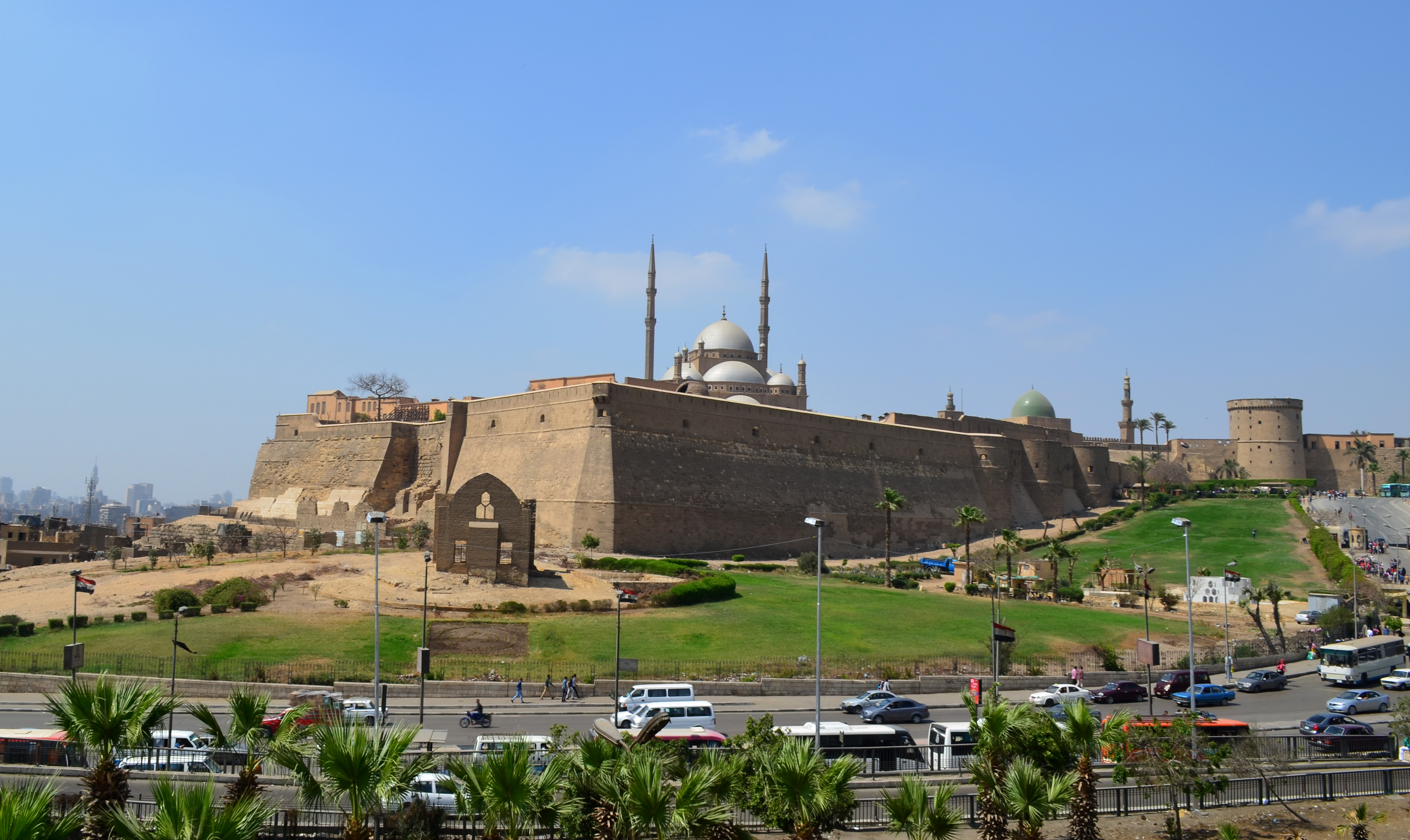
Cairo Citadel

- Babylon Fortress
- Cairo Citadel (Citadel of Saladin)
- Bab al-Barqiyya
- Bab al-Futuh
- Bab al-Nasr
- Bab Zuweila

== Historic commercial and civic buildings ==
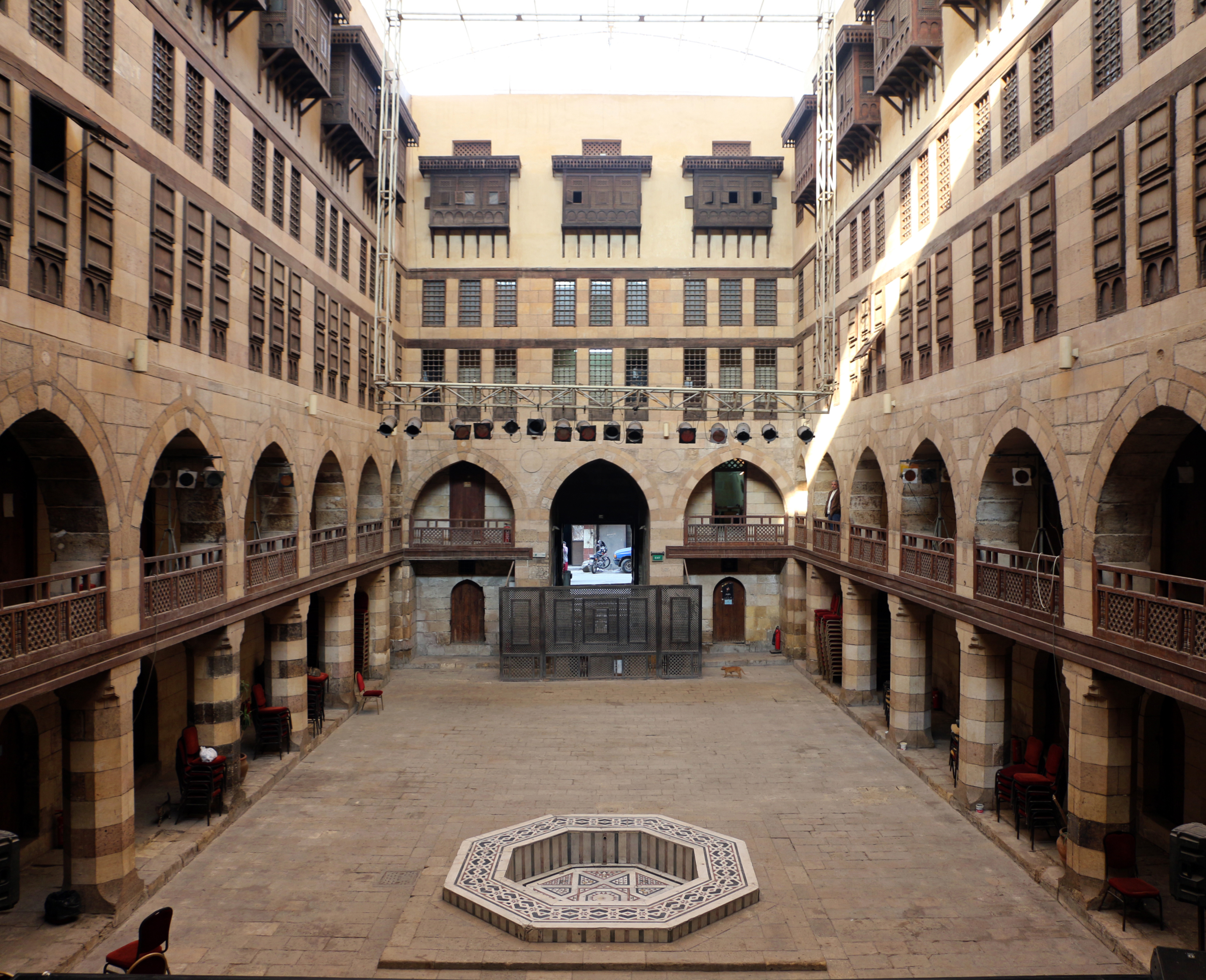
Wikala al-Ghuri

- Cairo Citadel Aqueduct
- Maristan of al-Mu'ayyad
- Maristan of Qalawun (part of Sultan Qalawun's complex)
- Sabil-Kuttab of Katkhuda
- Wikala and Sabil-Kuttab of Sultan Qaytbay
- Wikala of Sultan Al-Ghuri
- Wikala of Sultan Qaytbay

== Other buildings ==
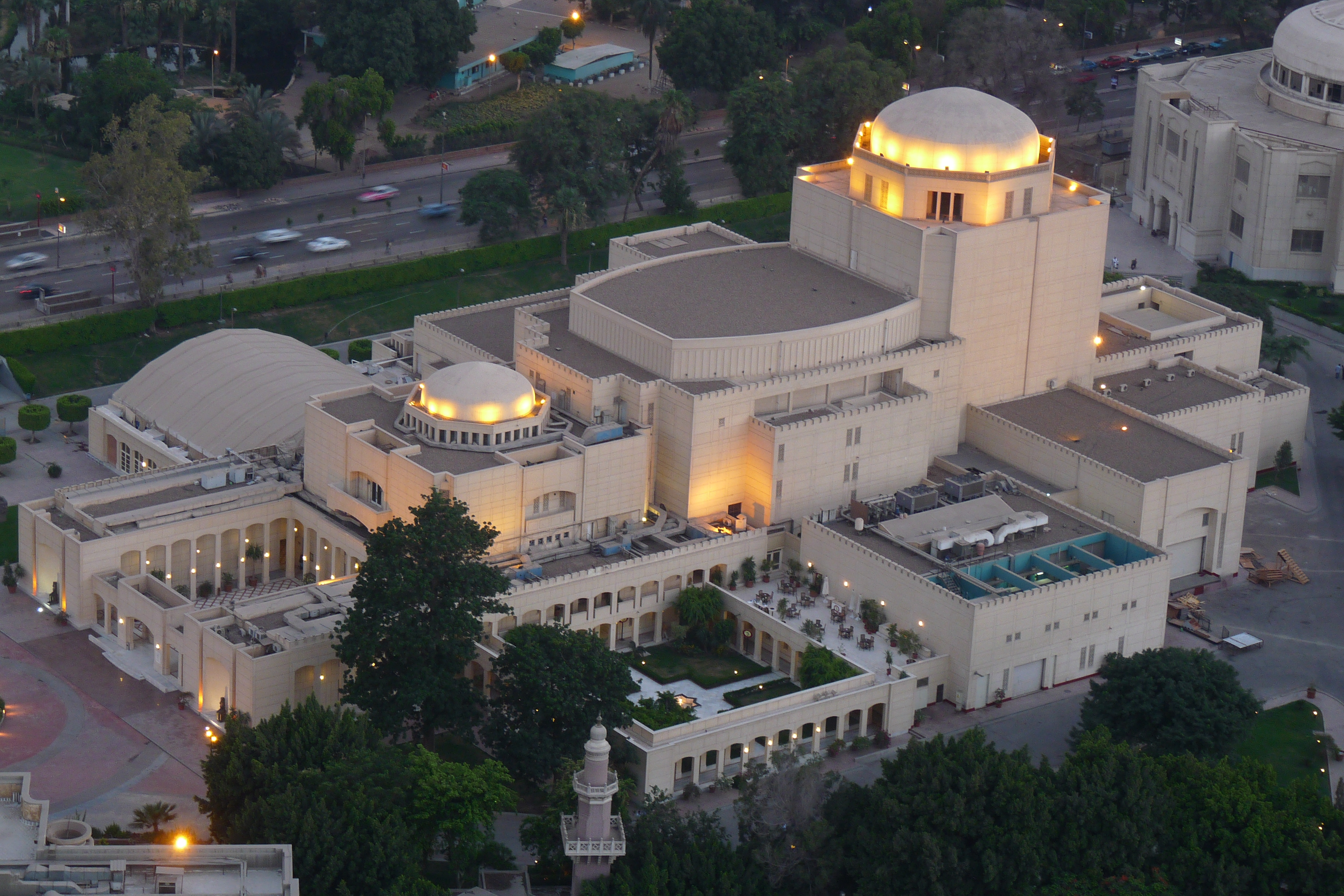
Cairo Opera House

- Belmont Building
- Cairo International Stadium
- Cairo Opera House
- Cairo Tower
- Headquarters of the Arab League
- The Mogamma
- Ramses Exchange
- Yacoubian Building
- Immobilia Building

== See also ==
- List of tallest buildings in Cairo
- Residential Architecture in Historic Cairo
