= List of mosques in Cairo =

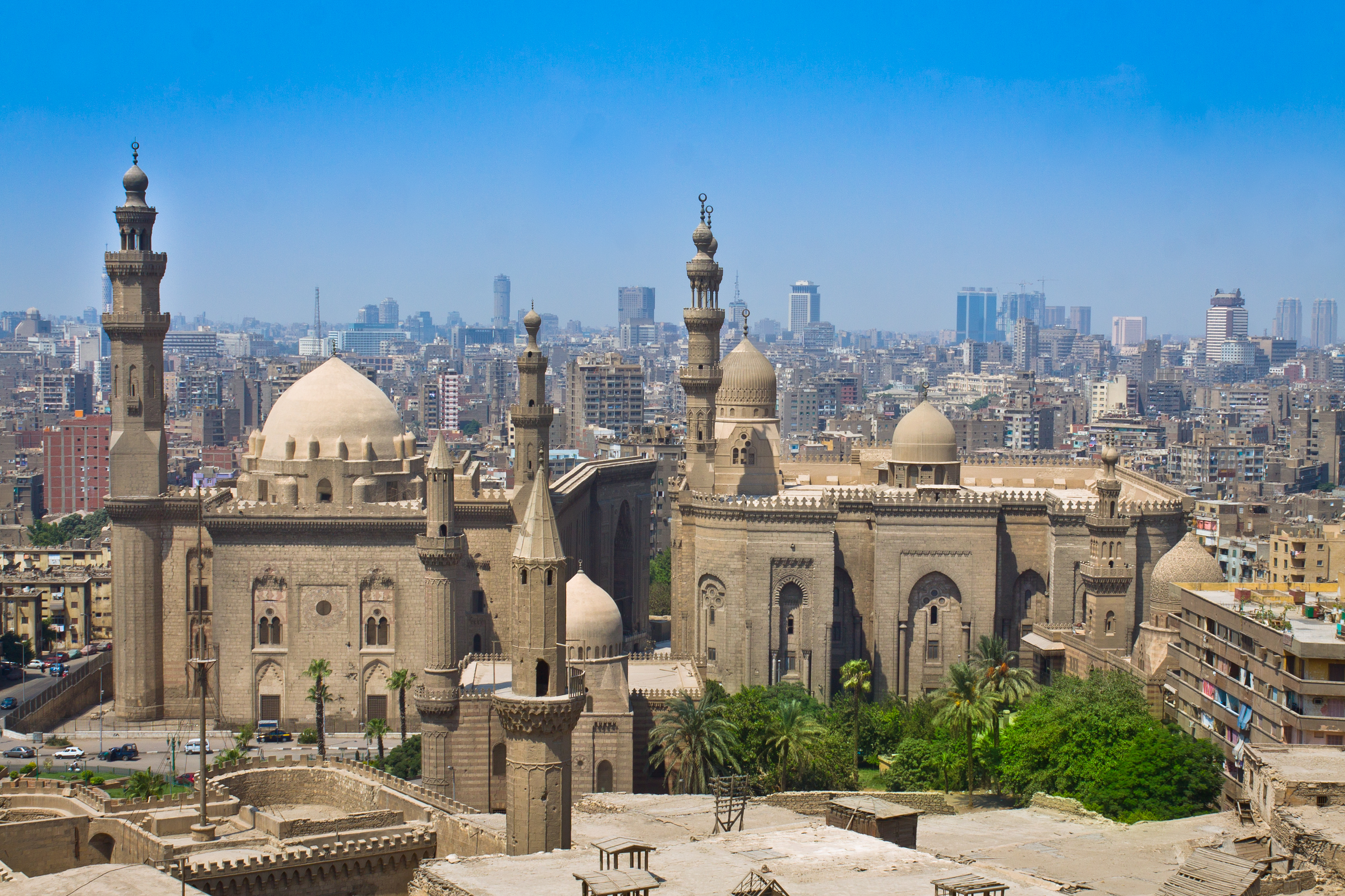
Cairo skyline featuring numerous minarets.

This is a list of mosques in Cairo, the capital city of Egypt.

Cairo holds one of the greatest concentrations of historical monuments of Islamic architecture in the world, and includes mosques and Islamic religious complexes from diverse historical periods. Many buildings were primarily designated as madrasas, khanqahs or mausoleums, rather than mosques; yet have nonetheless served as places of worship or prayer at some time or another, if not today.

== List of mosques ==
Name	Image	Year (CE)	Period	Neighborhood	Notes
Amr ibn al-As Mosque		642	Rashidun	Fustat; 30°0′37″N 31°13′59″E	The oldest mosque in Africa; although the building has been rebuilt and modified many times after its foundation.
Mosque of Ibn Tulun		884	Abbasid	Sayeda Zainab; 30°01′44″N 31°14′58″E	The oldest mosque in the city surviving in its original form, and the largest mosque in Cairo in terms of land area.
Al-Azhar Mosque		969	Fatimid	El-Hussein; 30°02′45″N 31°15′46″E	National mosque
Jami al-Qarafa Mosque		976	Fatimid	Al-Qarafa	Founded by Al-Sayyida al-Mu'iziyya and her daughter, Sitt al-Malik
Al-Hakim Mosque		1013	Fatimid	Al-Mu'izz Street; 30°03′16″N 31°15′50″E	Named in honour of al-Ḥākim bi-Amr Allāh
Lulua Mosque		c. 1015	Fatimid	Muqattam Hills; 30°01′11″N 31°16′05″E	Exact date of establishment is disputed; extensively rebuilt in 1998.
Juyushi Mosque		1085	Fatimid	Muqattam Hills; 30°01′19″N 31°16′07″E	Described as a mashhad
Aqmar Mosque		c. 1126	Fatimid	Al-Mu'izz Street; 30°03′06″N 31°15′43″E	An important monument of Fatimid architecture and of historic Cairo due to the exceptional decoration of its exterior façade and the innovative design of its floor plan.
Mashhad of Sayyida Ruqayya		1133	Fatimid	al-Khalifa; 30°01′32″N 31°15′7″E	One of the few and most important Fatimid-era preserved mausoleums in Cairo
Al-Hussein Mosque		1154	Fatimid	El-Hussein; 30°2′52″N 31°15′47″E	One of the holiest Islamic sites in Egypt, with an eclectic mix of architectural styles.
Al-Salih Tala'i Mosque		1160	Fatimid	Al-Darb al-Ahmar; 30°02′32″N 31°15′28″E	Named in honour of Tala'i ibn Ruzzik, and is the last major Fatimid monument to have been built and survived.
Mosque of al-Zahir Baybars		1269	Mamluk	al-Husayniya; 30°03′44″N 31°15′48″E	Named in honour of al-Zahir Baybars al-Bunduqdari
Qalawun Mosque		1285	Mamluk	Al-Mu'izz Street (Bayn al-Qasrayn); 30°02′58″N 31°15′39″E	An expanisive religious complex that includes a bimaristan (hospital), madrasa, mausoleum, and mosque, built by and named in honour of Sultan al-Mansur Qalawun
Madrasa of al-Nasir Muhammad		1303	Mamluk	Al-Mu'izz Street (Bayn al-Qasrayn); 30°02′59″N 31°15′40″E	A madrasa and mausoleum named in honour of al-Nasir Muhammad ibn Qalawu
Khanqah of Baybars (II) al-Jashankir		1310	Mamluk	al-Gamaliyya; 30°03′6″N 31°15′50″E	It is the oldest khanqah, or convent, that has survived in modern Cairo; named in honour of Baybars II
Al-Nasir Muhammad Mosque		1318	Mamluk	Cairo Citadel; 30°01′45″N 31°15′39″E	Named in honour of Al-Nasr Muhammad
Madrasa of Amir Sunqur Sa'di		1321	Mamluk	Al-Darb al-Ahmar; 30°01′59″N 31°15′14″E	Established as a madrasa and mausoleum, later repurposed as a Mevlevi Sufi takiyya, and in the 20th century, as an Islamic museum
Mosque of Amir al-Maridani		1339	Mamluk	Al-Darb al-Ahmar; 30°02′10″N 31°15′36″E	Built by Amir Altinbugha al-Maridani, with significant help from Sultan al-Nasir Muhammad
Aqsunqur Mosque		1347	Mamluk	Al-Darb al-Ahmar; 30°02′10″N 31°15′36″E	Built by Shams ad-Din Aqsunqur and named in his honour; the site contains the mausoleum of Aqsunqur and his sons
Shaykhu Mosque and Khanqah		1349	Mamluk	Al-Saleeba Street; 30°01′50″N 31°15′11″E	A mosque and khanqah, completed in 1349 and 1355 respectively, founded by Sayf al-Din Shaykhu al-Nasiri, a Grand Emir.
Mosque of Amir al-Sayf Sarghatmish		1356	Mamluk	Al-Saleeba Street; 30°01′49″N 31°15′05″E	A madrasa, mosque, and mausoleum founded by Sayf al-Din Sarghatmish al-Nasiri.
Mosque-Madrasa of Sultan Hasan		1362	Mamluk	Salah al-Din Square; 30°01′57″N 31°15′25″E	Also known as the Mosque of Sultan Hassan
Madrasa of Umm al-Sultan Sha'ban		1369	Mamluk	Al-Darb al-Ahmar; 30°02′14″N 31°15′34″E	Built by Sultan al-Ashraf Sha'ban in honour of his mother, Khawand Baraka
Mosque-Madrasa of Sultan Barquq		1386	Mamluk	Al-Mu'izz Street (Bayn al-Qasrayn); 30°03′1″N 31°15′41″E	Founded by Sultan al-Zahir Barquq and comprises a mosque, madrasa, mausoleum, and khanqah
Mahmud al-Kurdi Mosque		1395	Mamluk	Al-Darb al-Ahmar; 30°02′28″N 31°15′27″E	Founded by Mahmud al-Kurdi
Amir Jamal al-Din al-Ustadar Mosque		1407	Mamluk	Al-Tambakshiya Street; 30°03′03″N 31°15′48″E	Founded by Jamal al-Din al-Ustadar
Khanqah of Faraj ibn Barquq		1411	Mamluk	Northern Cemetery; 30°02′57″N 31°16′44″E	Founded by an-Nasir Faraj ibn Barquq, considered one of Cairo's finest Mamluk architecture buildings
Mosque of Qanibay al-Muhammadi		1413	Mamluk	Al-Saleeba Street; 30°01′51″N 31°15′15″E	Founded by Qanibay al-Muhammadi
Mosque of Sultan al-Muayyad		1421	Mamluk	Al-Mu'izz Street; 30°02′35″N 31°15′27″E	Founded by Al-Mu'ayyad Sayf ad-Din Shaykh and comprises a mosque and madrasa
Al Ashraf Mosque		1424	Mamluk	Al-Mu'izz Street; 30°02′51″N 31°15′28″E	Founded by Sultan Al-Ashraf Al-Barsbay and comprises a mosque, madrasa, mausoleum, and khanaqah
Khanqah-Mausoleum of al-Ashraf Barsbay		1432	Mamluk	Northern Cemetery; 30°2′51″N 31°16′38″E	Founded by Sultan Al-Ashraf Al-Barsbay and comprises a mausoleum, khanqah and mosque
Mosque of Taghribardi		1440	Mamluk	Al-Saleeba Street; 30°01′50″N 31°15′05″E	Founded by Amir Taghribird and comprises a mosque, madrasa, and khanaqah
Funerary complex of Sultan Qaytbay		1472	Mamluk	Northern Cemetery; 30°02′38″N 31°16′30″E	Founded by al-Ashraf Qaytbay and comprises a mosque, former madrasa, mausoleum and residential structures, that is featured on the E£1 banknote
Amir Qijmas al-Ishaqi Mosque		1481	Mamluk	Al-Darb al-Ahmar; 30°02′10″N 31°15′36″E	Founded by Sayf al-Din Qijmas al-Ishaqi; also known as the Abu Hurayba Mosque
Qubba al-Fadawiyya Mosque		1481	Mamluk	Abbassia; 30°04′11″N 31°16′48″E	
Amir Khayrbak Funerary Complex		1502	Mamluk	Al-Darb al-Ahmar; 30°02′10″N 31°15′36″E	The mausoleum was completed in 1502; and the mosque-madrasa completed in 1520
Mosque of Qani-Bay		1503	Mamluk	Salah al-Din Square; 30°01′56″N 31°15′28″E	Founded by Qani-Bay al-Sayfi; featured on the E£200 banknote
Sultan Al-Ghuri Complex		1503	Mamluk	Al-Mu'izz Street; 30°2′46″N 31°15′36″E	Founded by Qansuh al-Ghuri; western part remains an active mosque, with the eastern part, a former khanqah-mausoleum, now a tourist site
Demerdash Mosque		1523	Ottoman	Al-Wayli; 30°04′31″N 31°16′38″E	Named in honour of Abu Abdullah Muhammad ibn Al-Amir, known as Shaykh Demerdash, who is buried in the mosque.
Sulayman Pasha Mosque		1528	Ottoman	Cairo Citadel; 30°03′29″N 31°13′44″E	Founded by Hadim Suleiman Pasha and named in his honour; contains the grave and shrine of Sariat al-Jabal It is the first mosque established in Egypt in Ottoman architectural style.
Al-Mahmoudia Mosque		1567	Ottoman	Salah al-Din Square; 30°01′54″N 31°15′28″E	Founded by Mahmud Pasha, contains his grave, and named in his honour
Sinan Pasha Mosque		c. 1571	Ottoman	Boulaq, Downtown; 30°03′44″N 31°13′46″E	Founded by Koca Sinan Pasha and named in his honour
Al-Burdayni Mosque		1629	Ottoman	Al-Dawoudia; 30°01′34″N 31°15′14″E	Founded by Kareem al-din al-Bardayni and named in his honour
Mosque of Abu al-Dhahab		1774	Ottoman	El-Hussein; 30°02′46″N 31°15′42″E	Founded by Muhammad Bey Abu al-Dhahab and named in his honour
Muhammad Ali Mosque		1830	Ottoman	Cairo Citadel; 30°01′43″N 31°15′35″E	Founded by Muhammad Ali and named in his honour
Mosque-Sabil of Sulayman Agha al-Silahdar		1839	Ottoman	Muizz Street; 30°03′09″N 31°15′43″E	Contains a mosque, sabil, and kuttab, located at the beginning of Burjouan alley
Al-Sayyida Nafisa Mosque		1897	Ottoman	Northern Cemetery; 30°01′21″N 31°15′08″E	Present structure was built on the site of a 9th-century mosque-mausoleum
Al-Rifa'i Mosque		1911	Ottoman	Salah al-Din Square; 30°9′17″N 31°18′37″E	Also serves as the royal mausoleum of Muhammad Ali's family
Sayyidah Zainab Mosque		1940	Modern	Al-Saleeba Street; 30°1′54″N 31°14′31″E	Present structure was built on the site of an undated mausoleum; renovations in 1547 and 1768; rebuilt in 1940
Sayeda Aisha Mosque		1971	Modern	Salah al-Din Square; 30°01′29″N 31°15′24″E	Present structure built on the site of a 14th-century mosque-madrasa; renovated in 1762; rebuilt in 1971
Rabaa al-Adawiya Mosque		c. 1970s	Modern	Nasr City; 30°04′00″N 31°19′33″E	Location of the August 2013 Rabaa massacre where the mosque was partially destroyed; and subsequently rebuilt
Al-Fath Mosque		1990	Modern	Ramses Square, Downtown; 30°03′35″N 31°14′46″E	The 130 m-tall (430 ft) minaret in the third largest minaret in the world
Al-Rahman al-Rahim Mosque		2009	Modern	Salah Salem, Abbassiya; 30°03′41″N 31°16′59″E	
Islamic Cultural Center		2022	Modern	New Administrative Capital	Capacity for 137,000 worshippers; completed at a cost of E£800 million

== See also ==
- Islam in Egypt
- List of buildings in Cairo
- List of mosques in Egypt
