= Qubba al-Fadawiyya Mosque =

Mosque in Cairo, Egypt

- مسجد القبة الفداوية
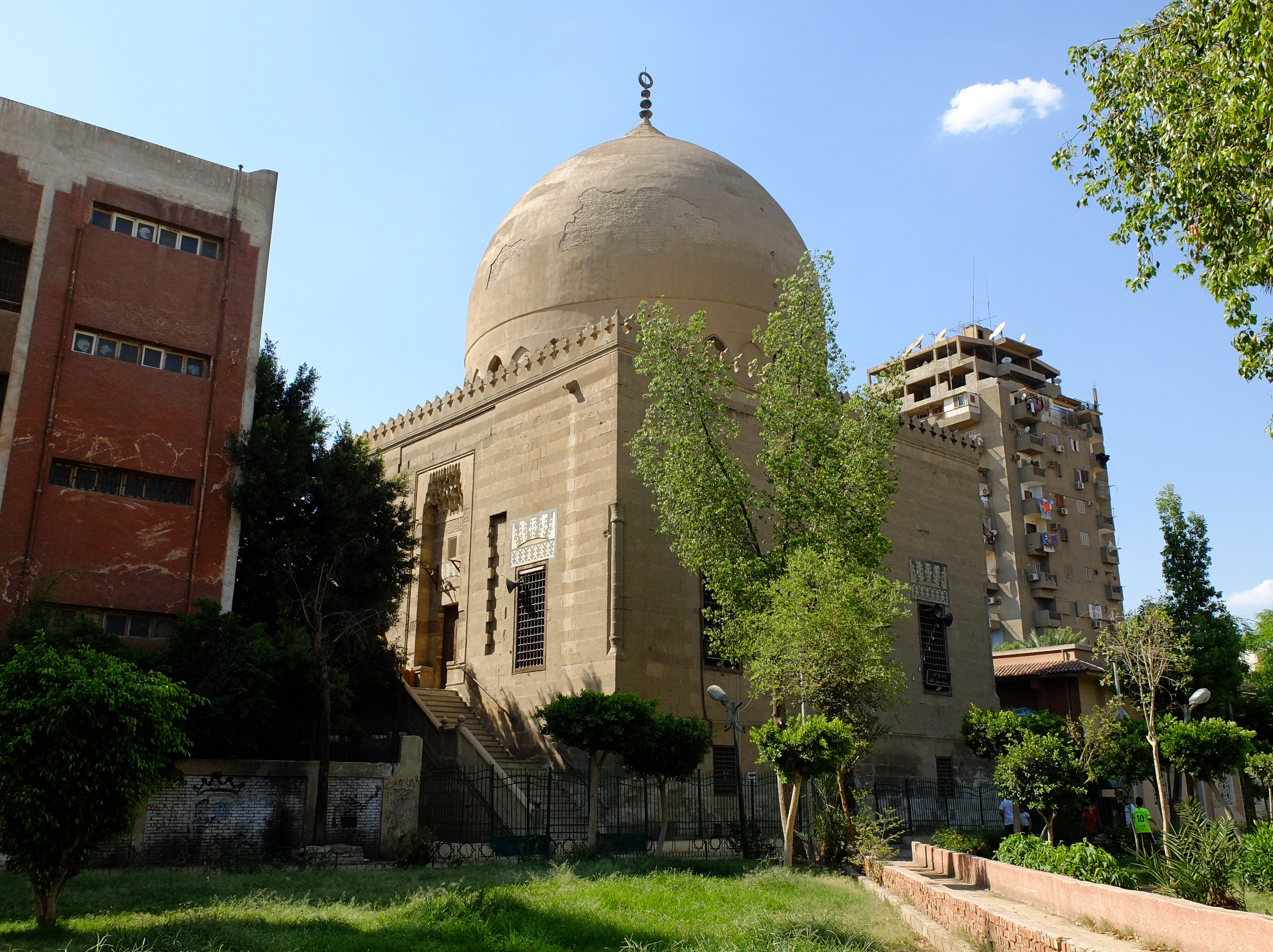

Religion
- Affiliation: Islam
- Ecclesiastical or organisational status: Mosque
- Status: Active

Location
- Location: Abbassia District, Cairo
- Country: Egypt
- Interactive map of Qubba al-Fadawiyya Mosque
- Coordinates: 30°04′11″N 31°16′48″E

Architecture
- Type: Mosque
- Style: Mamluk
- Completed: 1481 CE
- Dome: 1

Qubba Al-Fadawiyya Mosque or Qubba Al-Fidawiyya Mosque (Arabic: مسجد القبة الفِدَاوِيَّة, romanized: Masjid al-Qubba al-Fidāwiyya) is a mosque located in the Abbassia district of Cairo, Egypt. The mosque was completed in c. 1481, during the late Mamluk-era. The single-dome mosque is similar to the Dome of Yashbak min Mahdi Mosque located in Hadaek al-Qubbah district.

== History ==
The mosque was commission as a single-dome building by the commander Yashbak min Mahdi and ordered to be finished by Sultan Qaitbay in 1481 following the death of Yashbak in 1480.

== Gallery ==
Portal of the mosque

The dome between 1873 and 1895

Section of the dome

== See also ==
- Islam in Egypt
- List of mosques in Cairo
