= Mosque of Qanibay al-Muhammadi =

Mosque in Cairo, Egypt

- مسجد قاني باي المحمدي
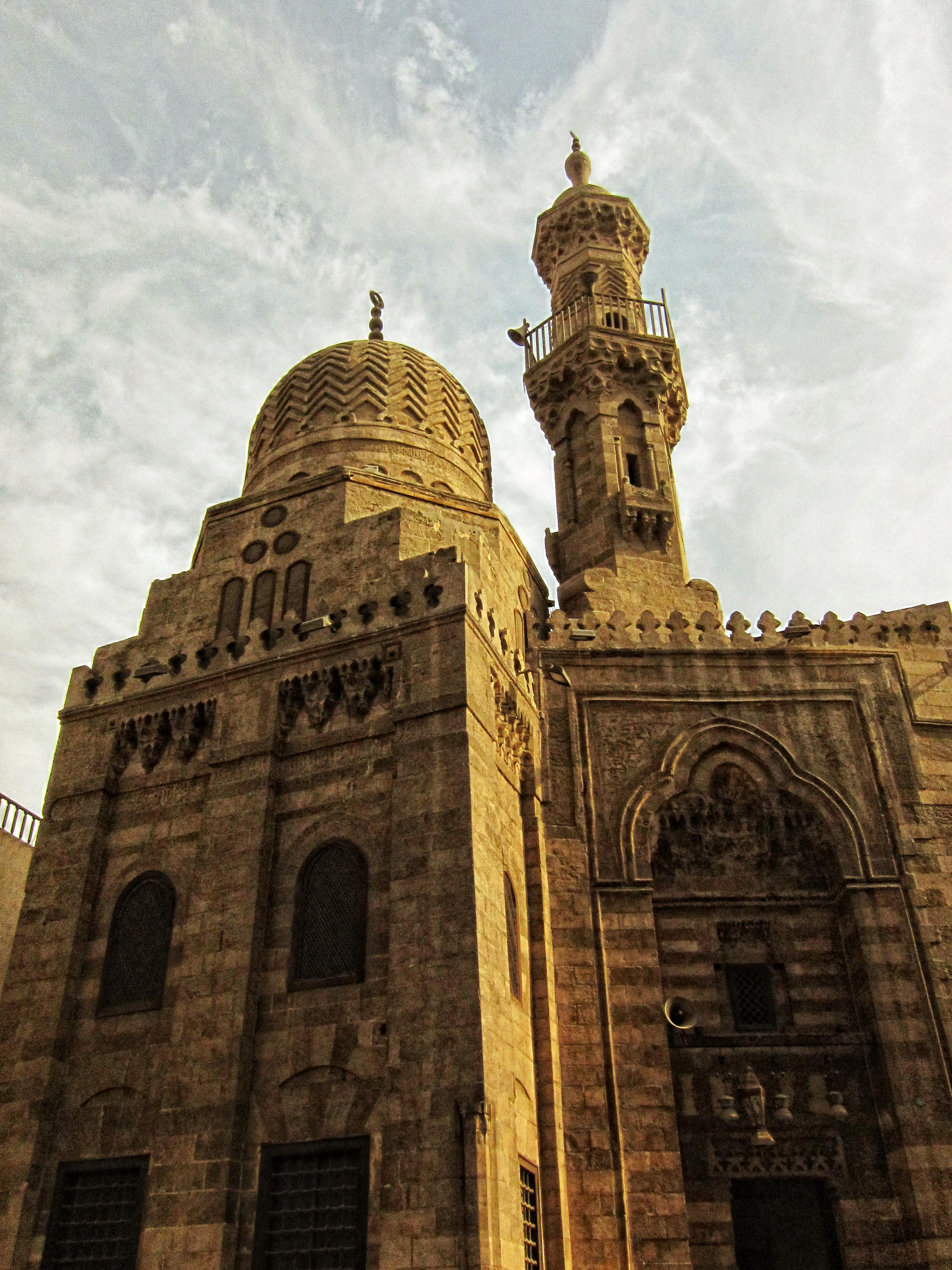

Religion
- Affiliation: Islam
- Ecclesiastical or organisational status: Mosque
- Status: Active

Location
- Location: Al-Saleeba street, Islamic Cairo
- Country: Egypt
- Interactive map of Mosque of Qanibay al-Muhammadi
- Coordinates: 30°01′51″N 31°15′15″E

Architecture
- Type: Mosque
- Style: Mamluk
- Founder: Qanibay al-Muhammadi
- Completed: 1413 CE

Specifications
- Dome: 1
- Minaret: 1

The Mosque of Qanibay al-Muhammadi (Arabic: مسجد قاني باي المحمدي) is a mosque located on Al-Saleeba street in Islamic Cairo, Egypt. Completed in 816 AH (1413/1414 CE) during the Burji dynasty era of the Mamluk Sultanate, it is located adjacent to the Mosque and Khanqah of Shaykhu.

== Patron ==
Prince Qanibay al-Muhammadi was bought by Sultan Al-Zaher Barqouq from a merchant named Muhammad; hence he obtained the nisbah of "al-Muhammadi". Qanibay served the Sultan Barqouq and then entered the service of Shaykh al-Mahmudi, deputy of Damascus, and was appointed as a great Dawudara during the Sultanate of Prince Faraj bin Barqouq. Dawudara is the title for one of the most important officials of the construction bureau, which was in charge of the correspondence of the official authorities and preparing the letters sent by the Sultan to various kings and princes. Then he was appointed as a deputy of Damascus during the reign of Sultan Shaykh al-Mahmudi, but was killed among other princes who rebelled against the Sultan. He was later buried in Damascus.

== See also ==
- Islam in Egypt
- List of mosques in Cairo
