= Mosque of Taghribirdi =

Mosque in Cairo, Egypt

- مسجد ومدرسة ابن تغري
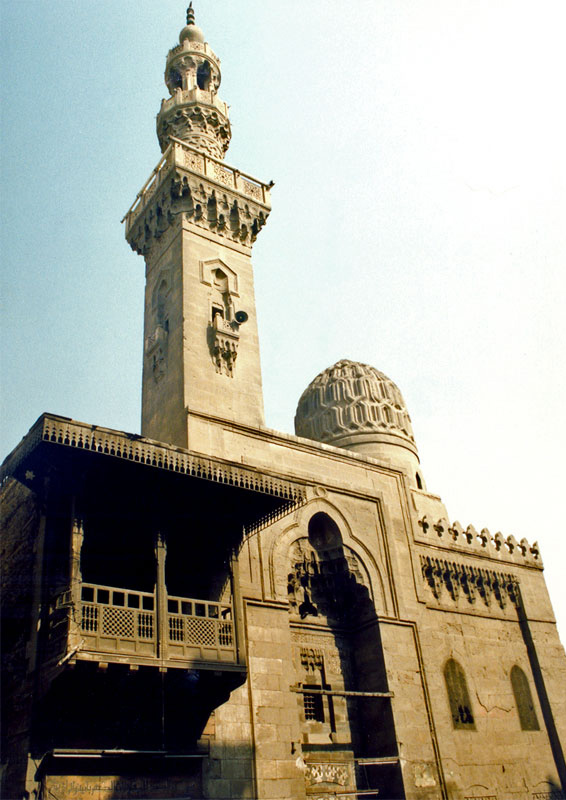

Religion
- Affiliation: Sunni Islam
- Sect: Sufism
- Ecclesiastical or organisational status: Mosque; Madrasa; Khanaqah
- Status: Active

Location
- Location: Saliba Street, Islamic Cairo
- Country: Egypt
- Interactive map of Mosque of Taghribirdi
- Coordinates: 30°01′50″N 31°15′05″E

Architecture
- Type: Mosque
- Style: Islamic; Mamluk
- Founder: Amir Taghribird
- Completed: 1440 CE

Specifications
- Dome: 1
- Minaret: 1
- Shrine: 1
- Materials: Stone; marble; stucco

The Mosque of Taghribirdi, also known as the Funerary Complex of Amir Taghribirdi, the Mosque and Madrasa of Taghribirdi (Arabic: مسجد ومدرسة ابن تغري بردي), and as the Madrasa of Taghri Bardi, is an Islamic funerary complex that contains a mosque, madrasa, and khanaqah, located on Saliba Street in Islamic Cairo, Egypt. The complex was completed in 1440 CE, during the Mamluk Sultanate by Amir Taghribirdi, the secretary to Sultan al-Zahir Jaqmaq.

== Amir Taghribirdi ==
The monument was founded in 1440 during the reign of Sultan al-Zahir Jaqmaq by Amir Taghribirdi, the father of the famed Islamic scholar, Ibn Taghribirdi. Amir Taghribirdi was purportedly a man of somber disposition who rose to prominence as a respected amir under Sultan Barsbay for his role in leading the Mamluk army against the Crusader Kingdom of Cyprus. For this achievement he was elevated to grand dawadar, or executive secretary, under Sultan al-Zahir Jaqmaq. However, Taghribirdi was murdered by his own mamluks shortly thereafter.

== Architecture ==
The Mosque of Taghribirdi is a mosque, a madrasa, and a khanaqah, representing the style of compact architecture popular in the late Mamluk period. Carved into the foundation of the mosque are two inscriptions, dating the building to Jumada I and Jumada II 844 of the Islamic calendar, or October and November 1440.

Situated on a street corner, the mosque has two facades. The main entrance is found on Sharia Saliba and features typical Mamluk architectural ornamentation, namely ablaq and marble accents. To the left of the elevated portal is a sabil, where a reconstructed kuttab was completed by Comité in 1911.

The minaret, located behind the sabil, has a square base, a stylistic element characteristic of the early 15th century. To the right, the monument encompasses a tomb facade and a small dome, which is constructed from brick and decorated with a lozenge-like pattern made of stucco. The side street facing the mosque's second facade has a view of a large round window over the mihrab of the mosque. The sahn remains open and covered by an awning and wire mesh; an inscription is carved around it. Wooden ceilings decorate the qibla and lateral iwans, while the interior is circled with an inlaid marble dado.

=== Orientation ===
A bird's-eye view of the mosque reveals its unique architectural feats. Because of its location at the corner of two streets, the mosque had to be set at an angle of almost 45 degrees in order to maintain a qibla orientation towards Mecca. Despite the difficulties this presented, the mosque includes a near-perfectly symmetrical arrangement with symmetrical windows and space on the qibla wall for the mausoleum. The extra wall space caused by this orientation has not been filled in with masonry, but rather turned into small cubed spaces used for light and air shafts, a unique feature of this particular building.

== See also ==
- List of madrasas in Egypt
- List of mosques in Cairo
- List of Historic Monuments in Cairo
- Late medieval domes
