= Al-Fath Mosque =

Mosque in Cairo, Egypt

- مسجد الفتح
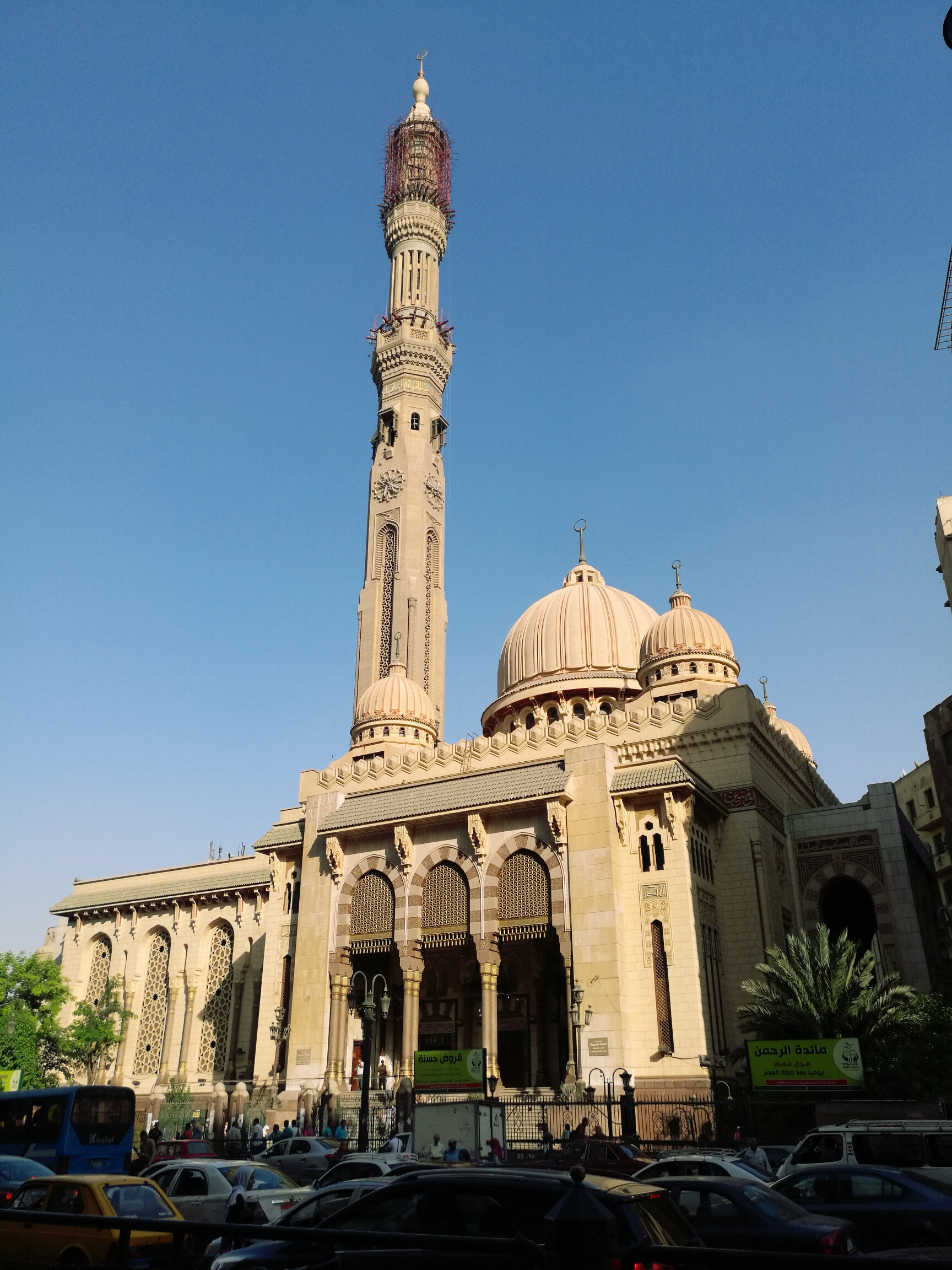

Religion
- Affiliation: Sunni Islam
- Ecclesiastical or organizational status: Mosque
- Status: Active

Location
- Location: Ramses Square, Downtown Cairo
- Country: Egypt
- Interactive map of Al-Fath Mosque
- Coordinates: 30°03′35″N 31°14′46″E

Architecture
- Architect: Hussein Bikri
- Type: Mosque
- Style: Modern Islamic
- General contractor: Arab Contractors
- Completed: 1990

Specifications
- Capacity: 5,000 worshipers
- Interior area: 2,000 m^{2} (22,000 sq ft)
- Domes: 5:(1 large; 4 small)
- Minaret: 1
- Minaret height: 130 m (430 ft)

The Al-Fath Mosque (Arabic: مسجد الفتح) is a mosque located in the Ramses Square of Downtown Cairo, Egypt. Completed in 1990, it is one of the largest mosques in the city. The mosque's 130-metre-tall (430 ft) minaret is the tallest in Cairo and the third tallest minaret in the world.

During the post-coup unrest in Egypt, the Second Ramses Incident took place in the mosque on August 16, 2013, which resulted in the death and injury of several protesters and subsequent shut down of the mosque.

== History ==
The mosque has its roots on the old mosque founded during the early Muslim conquests of Egypt. Today's Ramses Square was a village known as Um Dunin in the 7th century, in which the Islamic conquerors had established their center and the adjacent mosque as well. Later the mosque was expanded by the Fatimid Caliph Al-Hakim bi-Amr Allah and named as "Al-Maqs Mosque". According to the map of Al-Maqrizi, the name was a reference to the nearby castle existed back then on the island at the Nile, known as Qal'at Al-Maqs. The mosque was also called as Jami Bab al-Bahr. It developed during the era of Al-Hakim in the site to provide the need for the mosque within the siege area, and returning the wealth to the ordinary people. During the Fatimid-era, there were numerous palm trees within the yard, and caliphs enjoyed the view of the mosque from the fleet on the Nile.

The mosque was also called as Awlad 'Anan Mosque, an ode to two brothers who were experts on tasawwuf during the era of the Mamluk sultan Tuman bay II, Muhammad and Abdul Qadir bin 'Anan. The elder brother Muhammad was buried in the site in 1499, who was said to be lived until 120 years old, and this gave the mosque the name of Awlad 'Anan.

However, this old mosque was destroyed by the French occupational forces along with several other mosques during the Revolt of Cairo in 1798. A military facility was built on top of the ruins named after a French officer.

== Current mosque ==
Later, a new mosque was established on the same place by Arab Contractors, and inaugurated on February 22, 1990, by the former president of Egypt Hosni Mubarak during the celebration of Isra and Miraj. The newly founded mosque was named as "Al-Fath" which means "the conquest" in the Islamic context, and designed by the architect Hussein Bikri. The name Alwad 'Anan is also still being used. The 2,000-square-metre (22,000 sq ft) mosque has capacity for 5,000 worshipers.

=== Arab Spring ===
Two days after the August 2013 Rabaa massacre on August 14, 2013, supporters of Muhammad Morsi gathered together in the Ramses Square and the neighboring area of the mosque. When the police clashed with the demonstrators, some of them fled into the mosque and the place had eventually turned into a hospital for the injured. Next day morning, the police raided the mosque, and arrested the demonstrators before it was shut down. The incident is referred to as the Second Ramses Incident.

== See also ==
- Islam in Egypt
- List of mosques in Cairo
