= Mosque of Qani-Bay =

Mosque in Cairo, Egypt

- مسجد قاني باي الرماح
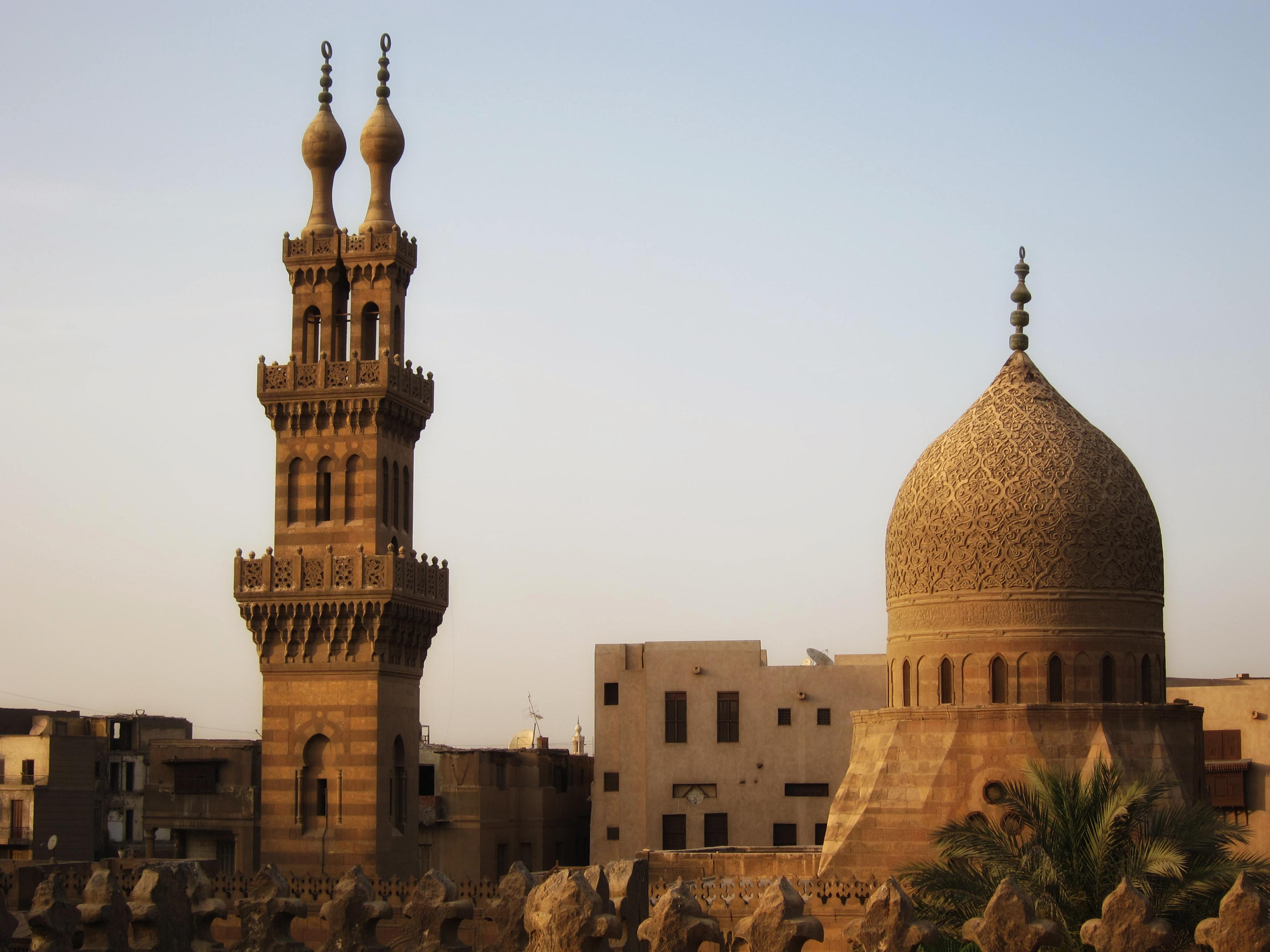

Religion
- Affiliation: Islam
- Ecclesiastical or organisational status: Mosque
- Status: Active

Location
- Location: Salah al-Din Square, Islamic Cairo
- Country: Egypt
- Interactive map of Mosque of Qani-Bay
- Coordinates: 30°01′56″N 31°15′28″E

Architecture
- Type: Mosque
- Style: Mamluk
- Founder: Qani-Bay al-Sayfi
- Completed: c. 1503 CE

Specifications
- Dome: 1
- Minaret: 1

The Mosque of Qani-Bay (Arabic: مسجد قاني باي الرماح) is a mosque near the Salah al-Din Square in Islamic Cairo, Egypt. The complex is named after Qani-Bay al-Sayfi, nicknamed "al-Rammah", who was Grand Master of the Horse during the reign of Sultan al-Ghuri.

== Overview ==
The mosque was completed in 908 AH (1502/1503 CE) and is located on a hill watching over the hippodrome and Mosque-Madrassa of Sultan Hassan. The site was chosen since the horse market and stables of the Citadel were originally located just off the square.

The complex has a main façade that takes maximum advantage of the view and at the same time exposes itself to the people below. The complex was restored in 1895 and then again in the early 2000s.

== Images in popular culture ==
The mosque features on the E£200 banknote.

== See also ==
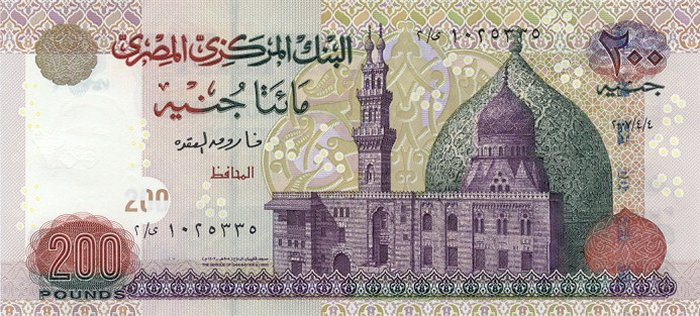
The mosque on an E£200 banknote

- Islam in Egypt
- List of mosques in Cairo
- Late medieval domes
