= Maadi Community Church =

Coordinates: 29.960264°N 31.266810°E

The Maadi Community Church (abbreviated as MCC) rents space in Maadi, an affluent suburb of Egypt's capital city Cairo. It meets under a tent canopy outdoors erected in 1994 on the grounds of the Church of St. John the Baptist. A church in the Anglican diocese of Egypt, North Africa and the Horn of Africa.

== History ==
The Maadi Community Church has been serving the English-speaking community of Cairo since 1947 when primarily Americans met for a periodic Sunday morning community service. This group developed into the present Maadi Community Church and established a constitution and called William Elmer as its first pastor in 1956. Dr. Otto F.A. Meinardus then served as pastor from 1957 to 1967. In June 2000, Maadi Community Church was formally recognized by Egyptian authorities as an independent international church under the name Evangelical International Church, though it still goes by the name "Maadi Community Church. MCC is under the authority of the Protestant Church of Egypt (Meglis al Milli).

The church experienced rapid growth under the leadership of David G. Petrescue, pastor of the church from 1992 to his death in Cairo on September 5, 2006. Pastor Petrescue articulated a visionary strategy from the Judges 15:4-5, enabling his congregation to become Egypt’s largest expatriate church. In that passage, Samson set the tails of foxes on fire, making them run, destroying the fields of the Philistines. Following this parable, Petrescue saw as the church's mission to foster evangelism among expatriate Christians in Egypt who would then move to other places throughout the world. Petrescue helped the church grow from around 150 people in 1992 to a congregation of 1,200 in 2006, representing more than 40 denominations and 40 nations. Maadi Community Church is involved in church planting of the Sudanese Community Church and Africa Community Church (serving many different African nations), leadership training, small groups, and outreach to Sudanese refugees in Egypt. For decades, one highlight of the year is the annual Christmas Pageant with music, drama, and live animals in early December.

In the 2000s, MCC developed further compassion and development activities in Egypt. These activities have resulted in African Hope Learning Center, a primary and secondary school for refugees; Maadi Community School, a primary and secondary school with a Christian foundation; Petrescue Bible Institute (formerly Victory Bible Institute) to train African pastors; Prison Ministry to bring food, blankets, medicine, and bible study material to Kanatar men and women's prisons; Maadi Women's Guild Benevolence that serves poor and disadvantaged populations around Cairo; and Healing Grace Ministries which is a child-sponsorship program providing food, medicine, clean water, and spiritual training in villages in the Minya province. MCC also has programs for youth, children, women, adult classes throughout the week, plus an intercessory prayer ministry.

Dr. Steven R. Flora served as senior pastor of the church from May 2008 to mid-to-late 2018 before returning to the US. The church began a search process soon after Pastor Steve’s departure but put it on hold due to the impact of COVID pandemic.The church continued to meet each week under the leadership of Pastor Amy Widener, Dave Dolsky, Jon Jarvie and Mike Chadwell. Before the search process resumed in 2022 the church council proposed and the membership voted and accepted the restructuring of the Sr.Pastor position into a Co-Pastor position.Pastor Amy was hired to be half of the co pastor relationship and the church commenced a new search process. In August 2023 Pastor Sean Smith was hired to be the partnering co pastor with Amy.
