= Demerdash Mosque =

Mosque in Cairo, Egypt

- مسجد الدمرداش
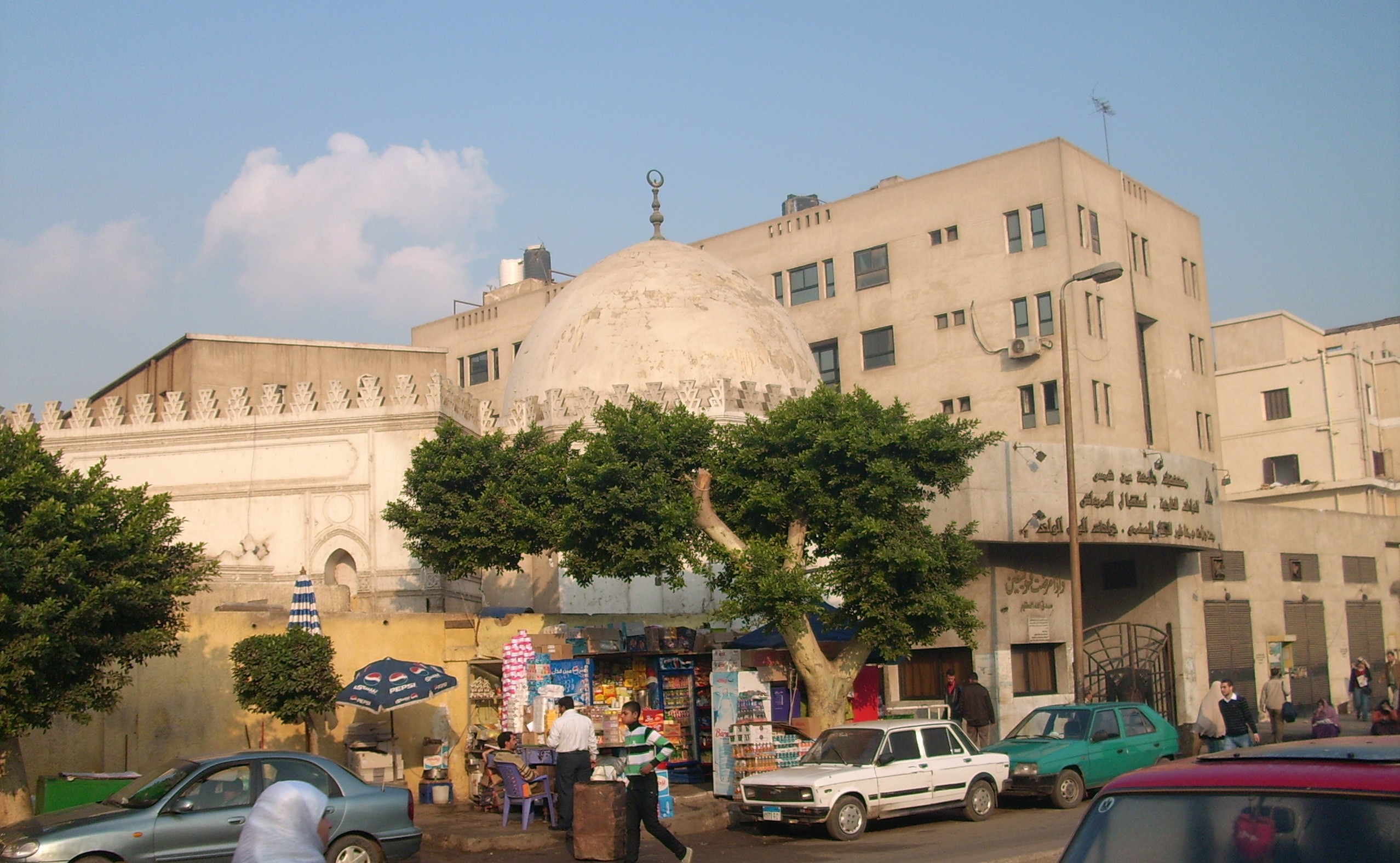

Religion
- Affiliation: Islam
- Ecclesiastical or organizational status: Mosque and mausoleum
- Status: Active

Location
- Location: Al-Wayli, Cairo
- Country: Egypt
- Interactive map of Demerdash Mosque
- Coordinates: 30°04′31″N 31°16′38″E

Architecture
- Type: Mosque
- Style: Mamluk
- Completed: 1523 CE

Specifications
- Interior area: 110 m^{2} (1,200 sq ft)
- Dome: 1
- Minaret: 1

The Demerdash Mosque (Arabic: مسجد الدمرداش) is a mosque and mausoleum located in the Al-Wayli district of Cairo, Egypt. Completed in 1523 CE, during the Mamluk era, it is situated in Abbassia, next to the Demerdash Hospital, and forms part of the Ain Shams University. The mosque is named in honour of Abu Abdullah Muhammad ibn Al-Amir, known as Shaykh Demerdash, who is buried in the mosque.

== History ==
The mosque was built in the early 16th century during the Mamluk era of Egypt. The original land where the mosque was built on was a gift from Sultan Qaytbay to thank Sidi Demerdash for his service. A mosque was built there for him. When the Ottomans arrived in 1524, Sidi Demerdash died and he was buried in the corner of the mosque.

The Demerdash Mosque and surrounding buildings were plundered by the French troops during the French occupation of Egypt.

In 2018 it was reported that theft was prevalent at the mosque and residents also complained that the bathrooms in the mosque were in a poor condition.

== Architecture ==
The area of the main mosque building is approximately 110 square metres (1,200 sq ft). The mosque is topped with an onion dome which has sixteen small openings on the bottom, eight of which are open as windows and the other eight are closed as a mere ornamental design. Three large muqarnas stand in each of the four corners of the mosque.

Inside the mosque, the tomb of Sidi Demerdash is located north of the minbar, in a corner of the mosque. His grave is covered by a zarih enclosure made out of lathed wood. In the western side of the mosque there is a tomb dedicated to one of the wives of the Khedive of Egypt, Hassan Effendi. Then in the eastern side, another grave is present, which is that of Sinan Pasha.

== Gallery ==
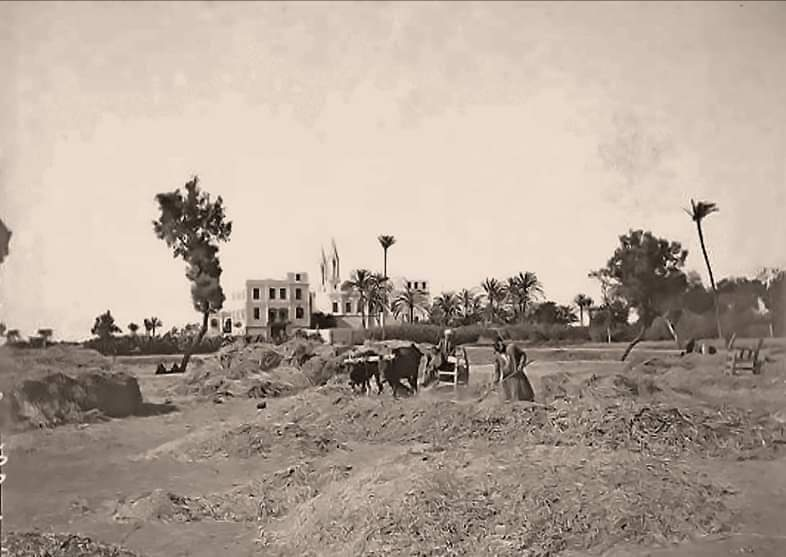
The mosque and the adjacent Pasha Palace, 1897

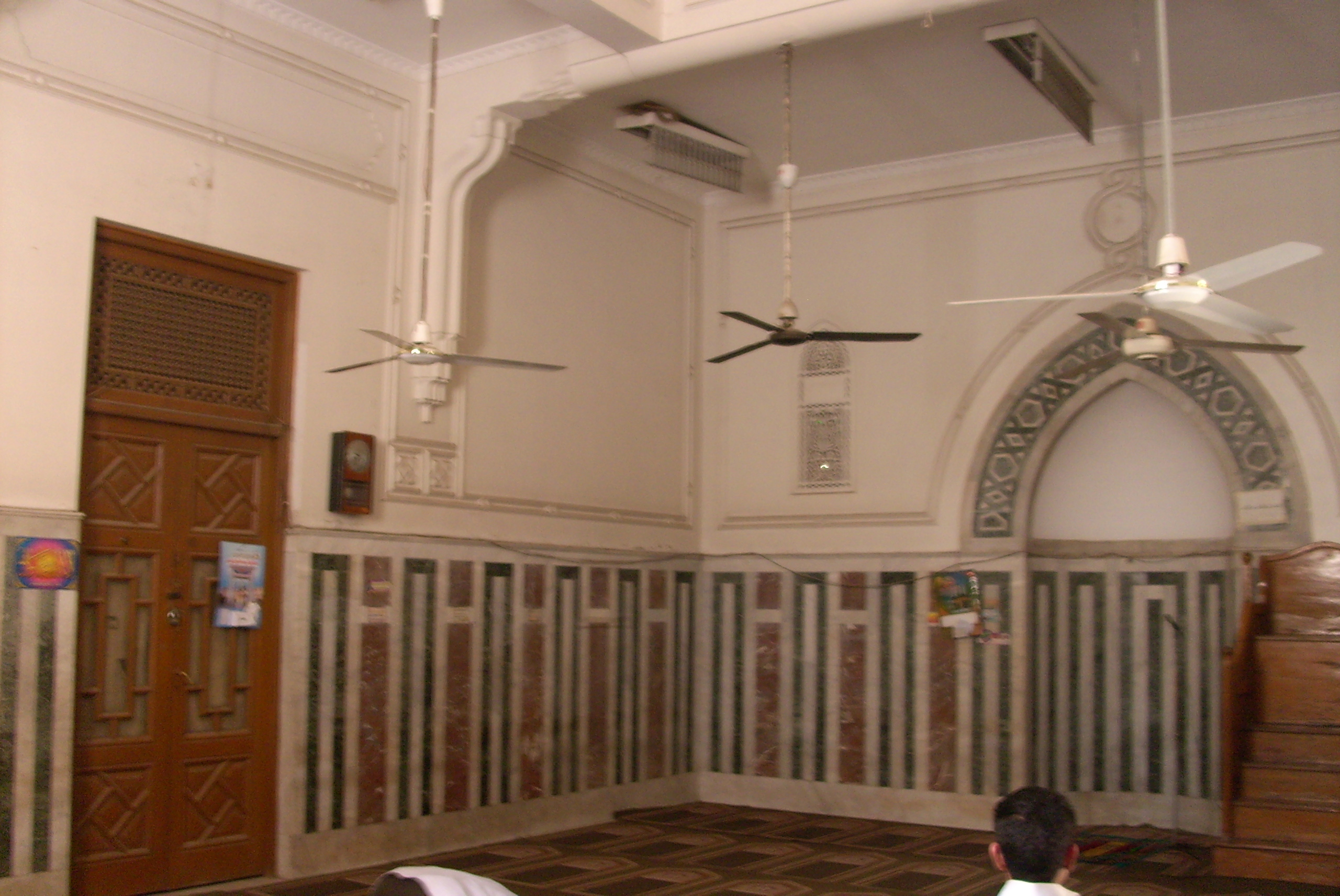
Inside the mosque

== See also ==
- Islam in Egypt
- List of mausoleums in Cairo
- List of mosques in Cairo
