= Al-Burdayni Mosque =

Mosque in Cairo, Egypt

- مسجد البرديني
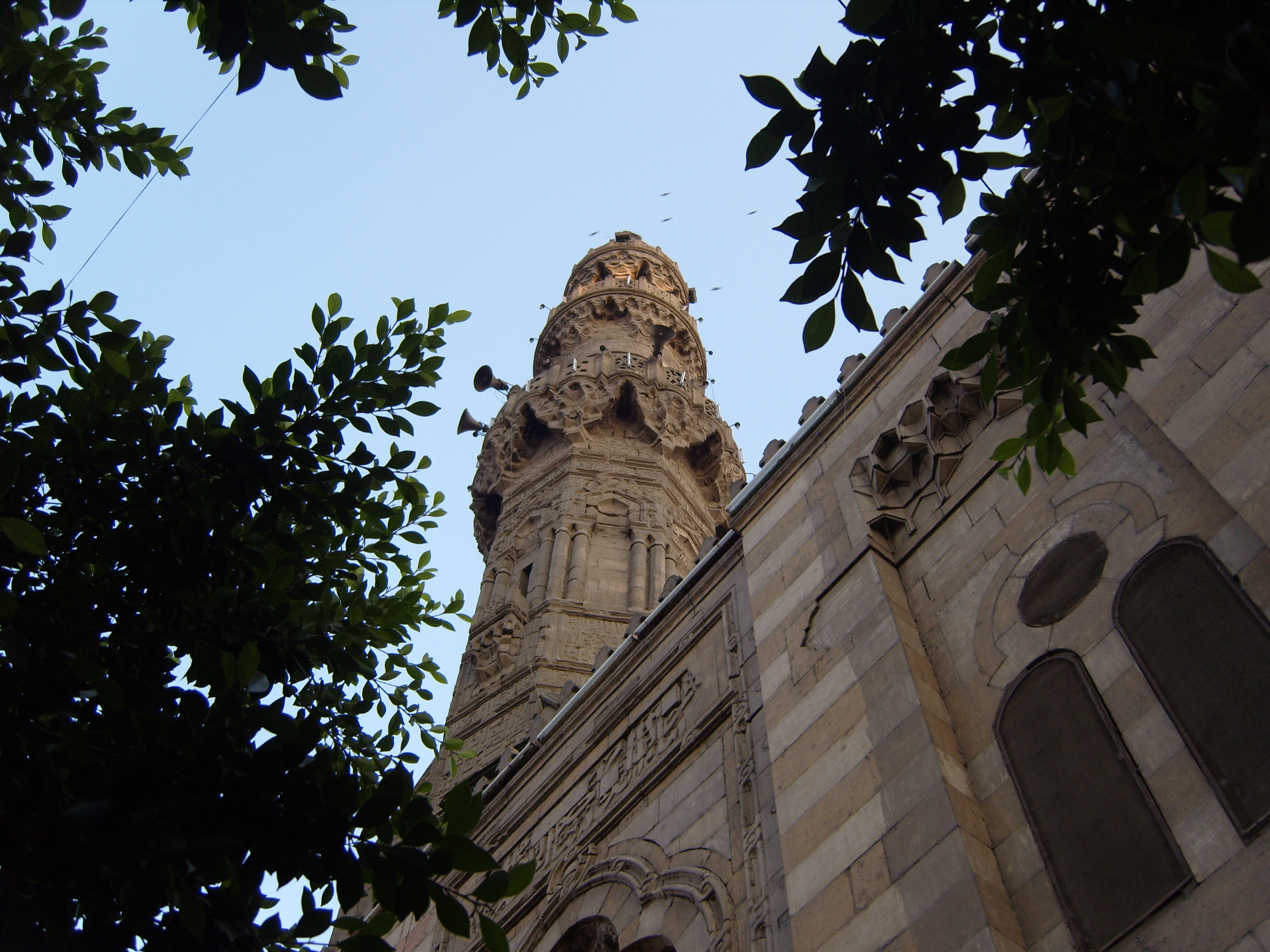

Religion
- Affiliation: Islam
- Ecclesiastical or organisational status: Mosque
- Status: Active

Location
- Location: Al-Dawoudia, Islamic Cairo
- Country: Egypt
- Interactive map of Al-Burdayni Mosque
- Coordinates: 30°01′34″N 31°15′14″E

Architecture
- Type: Mosque
- Style: Islamic; Mamluk
- Founder: Kareem al-din al-Bardayni
- Completed: 1616 CE

Specifications
- Minaret: 1
- Materials: Marble; mosaics; timber

The Al-Burdayni Mosque (Arabic: مسجد البرديني) is a mosque located in Al-Dawoudia, in Islamic Cairo, Egypt, near the Mosque of al-Malika Safiyya. The mosque was completed in 1616 CE during the Ottoman rule, funded by a wealthy merchant, Kareem al-din al-Bardayni. The building is made of stone and has gates erected in 1629 CE on two sides on the west, right of the fountain.

== History ==
The mosque was completed under Ottoman rule after the Ottomans defeated the Mamluks in 1517 CE and ruled over Egypt until 1867 CE. The mosque was built in the Mamluk style (not in the Ottoman style that was the prevailing style of choice at the time). Karim al-Din al-Burdayni did not align himself with the cultural practices of the Turks nor the Egyptians, which impacted the mosque's architectural style.

== Description ==
Although the mosque was built during the Ottoman era, the mosque's architecture retains many Mamluk features, including the fountain which is full of motifs and inscriptions. Al-Burdayni Mosque is small in scale and L-shaped making the mosque visible from two different faces, both of which serve as entrances. To the right of the mosque is the minaret, where many different Islamic architectural styles come together. The first tier of the minaret is octagonal in shape with carvings of triangular arches; the second tier is circular with vegetal motifs classic to Islamic architecture; and finally a bulb-like structure rests on the top with muqarna (or stalactites), like ornament around it.

The interior decoration also contains elements of the Mamluk state of Circassia gathered in detail. This is a small stained marble, that covers the walls and the roofs above the windows decorated with coloured glass to create the sense of consistency. The minaret is unique, as it is the only minaret during the Ottoman era to have a band with an inscription of the date 1623 around the octagonal bottom part of the minaret.

The nearest mosque to al-Burdayni Mosque is the Mosque of Malika Safiya which has little-to-no ornamentation. These two mosques contrast in size. The Al-Burdayni Mosque is a humble-size mosque with heavy ornamentation, while the Malika Safiya Mosque shows strength and power through its scale and hardly any ornamentation.

The contrast of style and ornament of other mosques compared to al-Burdayni is because of the different patrons. Karim al-Din al-Burdayni was a wealthy merchant that would have seen the materials that were ultimately used in this mosque during his work and travel.

The interior of the mosque revives Mamluk art and architecture. Detailed stained glass windows allow sunlight to enter and decorate the space with colour. The minbar is made of wood and mother-of-pearl with geometric designs that create a shine from the pearl and more ornament from the mosaics. On the other side of the minbar is a dikka, or columns in a mosque, for the imam to stand between to recite the Qur'an for everyone in the mosque to hear. This dikka also has an inscription band in the late Mamluk style. The mihrab is covered with inlaid marble and blue-glass plates, which is a symbol of the exceptional Mamluk tradition and culture. The walls are made with slabs of polychrome marble with intricate details and mosaics.

There is also a raised gallery in the mosque that is also extremely decorated. Square Kufic calligraphy of Qur'anic text is used to beautify the space and confirm that it is an Islamic structure. The wooden ceiling is a stylistic choice to diffuse the harsh sun into a soft glow for worshippers in the mosque.

== See also ==
- Dawoodi Bohra
- Islam in Egypt
- List of mosques in Cairo
