= Lulua Mosque =

Mosque in Cairo, Egypt

- مسجد اللؤلؤة
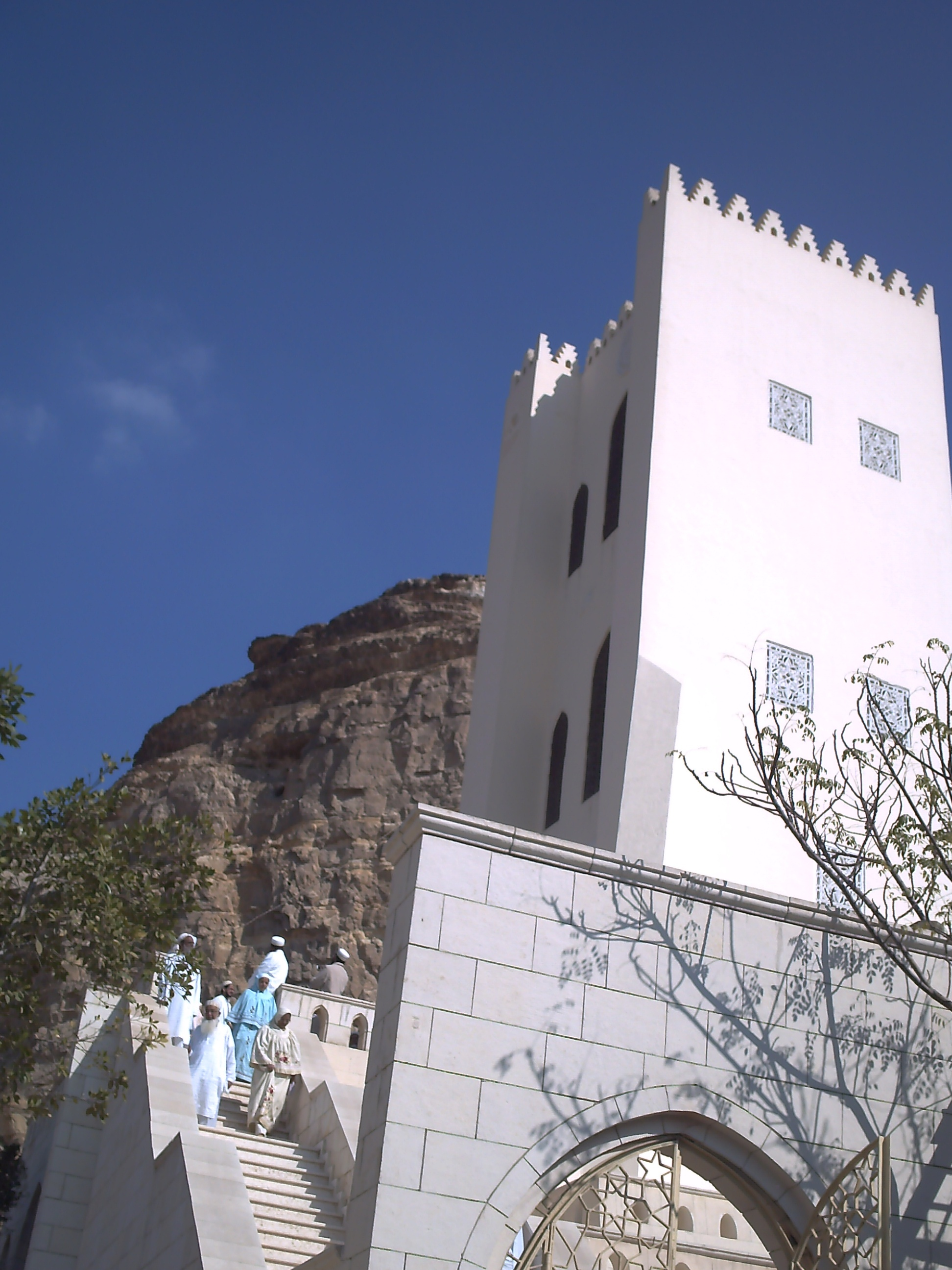
- The mosque in 2010, after its renovation

- Location of the mosque relative to the Nile Delta

Religion
- Affiliation: Islam
- Ecclesiastical or organisational status: Mosque
- Status: Active

Location
- Location: Muqattam Hills, Cairo, Cairo Governorate
- Country: Egypt
- Interactive map of Lulua Mosque
- Coordinates: 30°01′11″N 31°16′05″E

Architecture
- Type: Mosque
- Style: Fatimid
- Founder: Al-Hakim bi-Amr Allah
- Completed: c. 1016 CE (original); 1998 (refurbishment)

Specifications
- Dome: 1
- Minaret: 1
- Materials: Limestone; rubble; bricks

The Lulua Mosque or al-Lu'lu'a Mosque (Arabic: مسجد اللؤلؤة, romanized: Masjid al-Lu'lu'a, lit. 'Mosque of the Pearl') is a mosque in the Muqattam Hills that surround Cairo, Egypt. Built during the reign of the third (Note: Sources conflict on the period of dating the mosque - either during the reign of the third Fatimid caliph, according to MIT, or of the sixth caliph, according to Encyclopædia Iranica. MIT is cited here, pending agreement of authoritative sources.) Fatimid caliph, al-Hakim, in the Fatimid architectural style, the mosque was completed in c. 1016 CE. Located in the Southern Cemetery in the Moqattam hills, the majority of the mosque collapsed in 1919, but was later refurbished in 1998 by the Dawoodi Bohras, who trace their religious lineage to the Fatimid Caliphate's Shia Islam.

== Geography ==
The mosque is located near Cairo's Southern Cemetery of the Muqattam Hills, a low range of hills to the east of Cairo. The range has an average height of 180 metres (590 ft) with the highest peak at 213 metres (699 ft) above sea level and is divided into three sections. The highest segment is a low mountain landform called Moqattam Mountain. It was an important ancient Egyptian quarry site for limestone, used in construction of mosques and churches. The Lulua Mosque was also built with this limestone. The mosque is close to this hill range. The mosque is approximately 1 kilometre (0.62 mi) from the Sharia Salah Salim, towards the southeast.

== History ==
Fatimid Caliph al-Hakim (996–1021), the third caliph in Egypt of the Ismaili Shia Dynasty, also credited with establishing various buildings in Cairo, built this mosque among many small mosques that were built in the Muqattam Hills. It is told that Hakim used to visit the mosque alone at night for worship. The name al-Lu'lu'a means "the pearl" as the mosque's exterior appearance was ornate and lustrous.

The first reported refurbishing of the mosque was in the 16th century. After its façade and vaults collapsed in 1919, the mosque was refurbished by India's Dawoodi Bohra community in the late 1990s. The Bohras trace their religious lineage to the Ismāʿīlī Islam practiced by the Fatimid Caliphate.

== Features ==
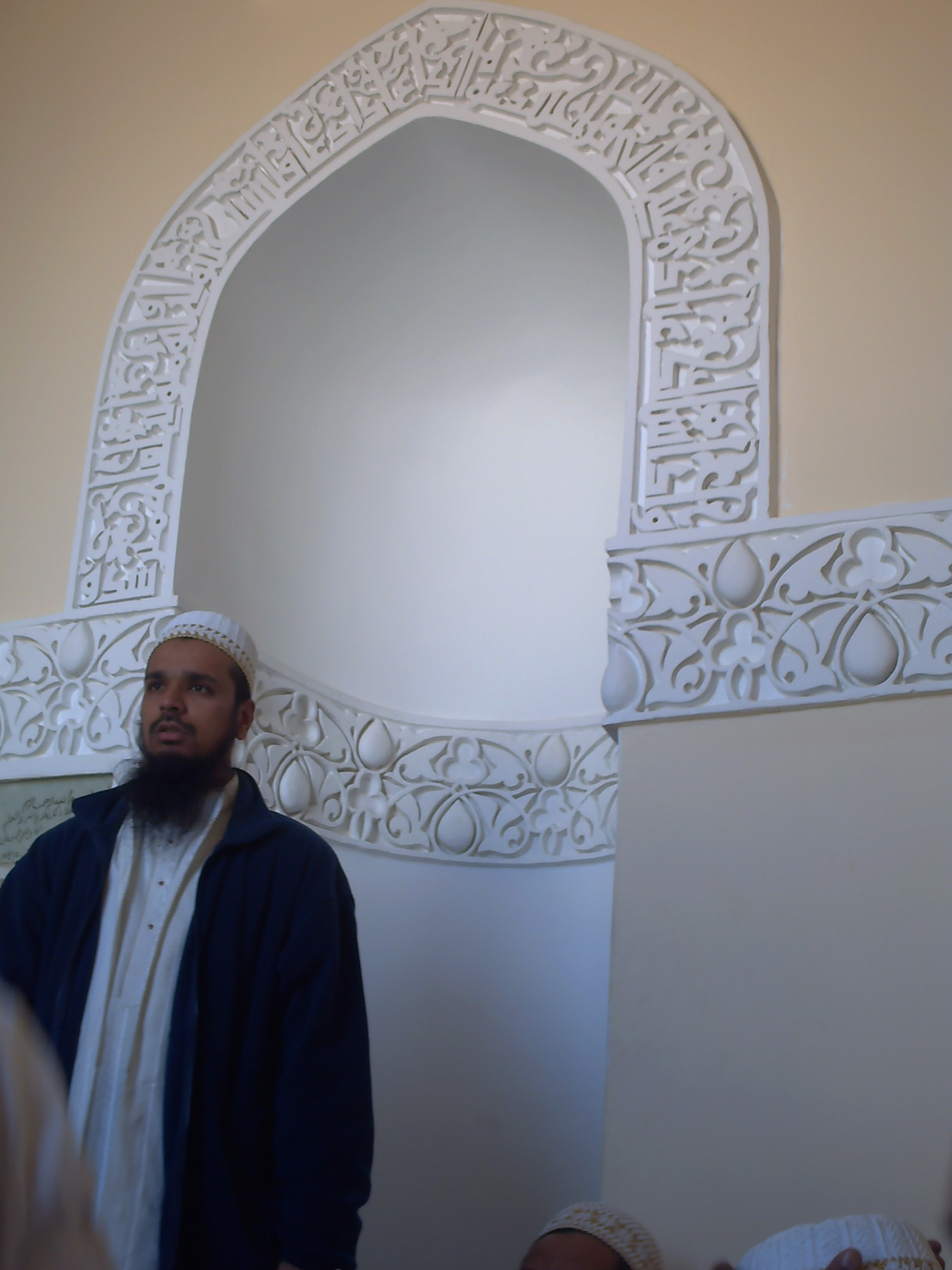
Mihrab inside the renovated mosque

The Fatimid mosque was built on a promontory of limestone, precariously perched as a detached component of the hill range. The exposed limestone formed the foundation for the mosque structure. The mosque was built in the unique Fatimid architectural style. It is one of the early mosques built in Egypt, where the typical Fatimid architectural style, which involved portals with slight protrusions, mihrabs and qibla walls (covered by ornamentation) topped by domes indicative of the place of worship, columned porches with triple arches or keel shaped arches, frontage with inscriptions could be seen. The Lulua Mosque consisted originally of a three-storey tower-like structure built over a rectangular plan. The ground floor was partially excavated from the hill. It was barrel vaulted having a triple-arched entrance, simple qibla (mihrab) on the back wall at each floor (multiple qibla in one mosque a unique feature for this mosque) and was constructed of limestone with rubble. The upper stories were constructed with bricks and the interior walls were plastered. One of these upper stories also had a triple-arched entrance; the arches were built with brick and stone. The middle floor, barrel vaulted, had an ornamented mihrab at back and one rectangular window. The top floor had two compartments, each having one window. The vaults at the upper floors were built with brick.

Some of the architectural features common to all mosques built by Al-Hakim, including Lulua Mosque, are adoption of projected portals and domes over mihrabs for ceremonial purposes. Keel-shaped arches in porticoes and arcades were also prominent features. The profusion of fine stucco decorations was seen in large numbers, particularly on mihrabs and qibla walls. Iconographic inscriptions were abundant on the façade.

A manzara was also built near the mosque, which was used as a guest house for foreign visitors and subsequently converted into a hostel for merchants visiting from other countries.

== See also ==
- Islam in Egypt
- List of mosques in Cairo
- List of mosques in Egypt
