= Salah al-Din Square =

City square in Cairo, Egypt

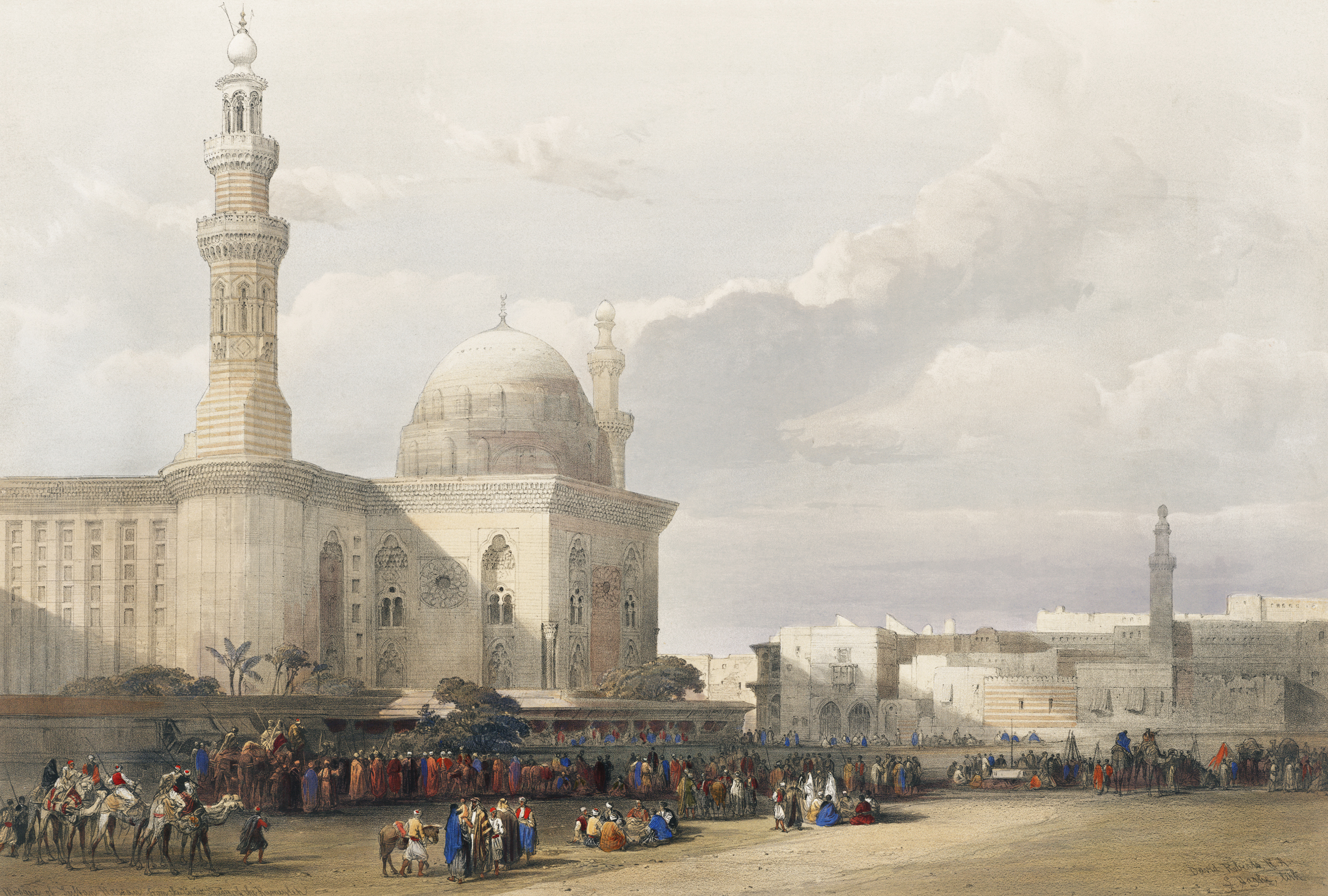
- The square in the 1840s, from The Holy Land, Syria, Idumea, Arabia, Egypt, and Nubia

- Location within Nile Delta
- Former names: Al-Rumaila Square, Black Square
- Location: Islamic Cairo, Cairo, Egypt
- Coordinates: 30.031°N 31.257°E

Other
- Designer: Sultan Al-Nasir Muhammad

Salah al-Din Square (Arabic: ميدان صلاح الدين, lit. 'Saladin Square'), known historically as Al-Rumaila Square (Arabic: ميدان الرميلة, lit. 'Sandy Square'), Black Square, and colloquially as Citadel Square (Arabic: ميدان تحت القلعة, lit. 'Square under the citadel') is the main city square of Islamic Cairo. It is considered among the most important areas in Egypt, having witnessed many significant political and social events.

It is sometimes considered to be two squares adjacent to each other, with historical Al-Rumaila lying northwest of the Citadel Square; they had once been separated by a wall, which can be seen in the maps of Carsten Niebuhr map of Cairo, and in the Description de l'Égypte.

== Name ==
The Citadel Square was known in the past as “Rumaila Square” and was recently known as “Salah al-Din Square.”

== History ==
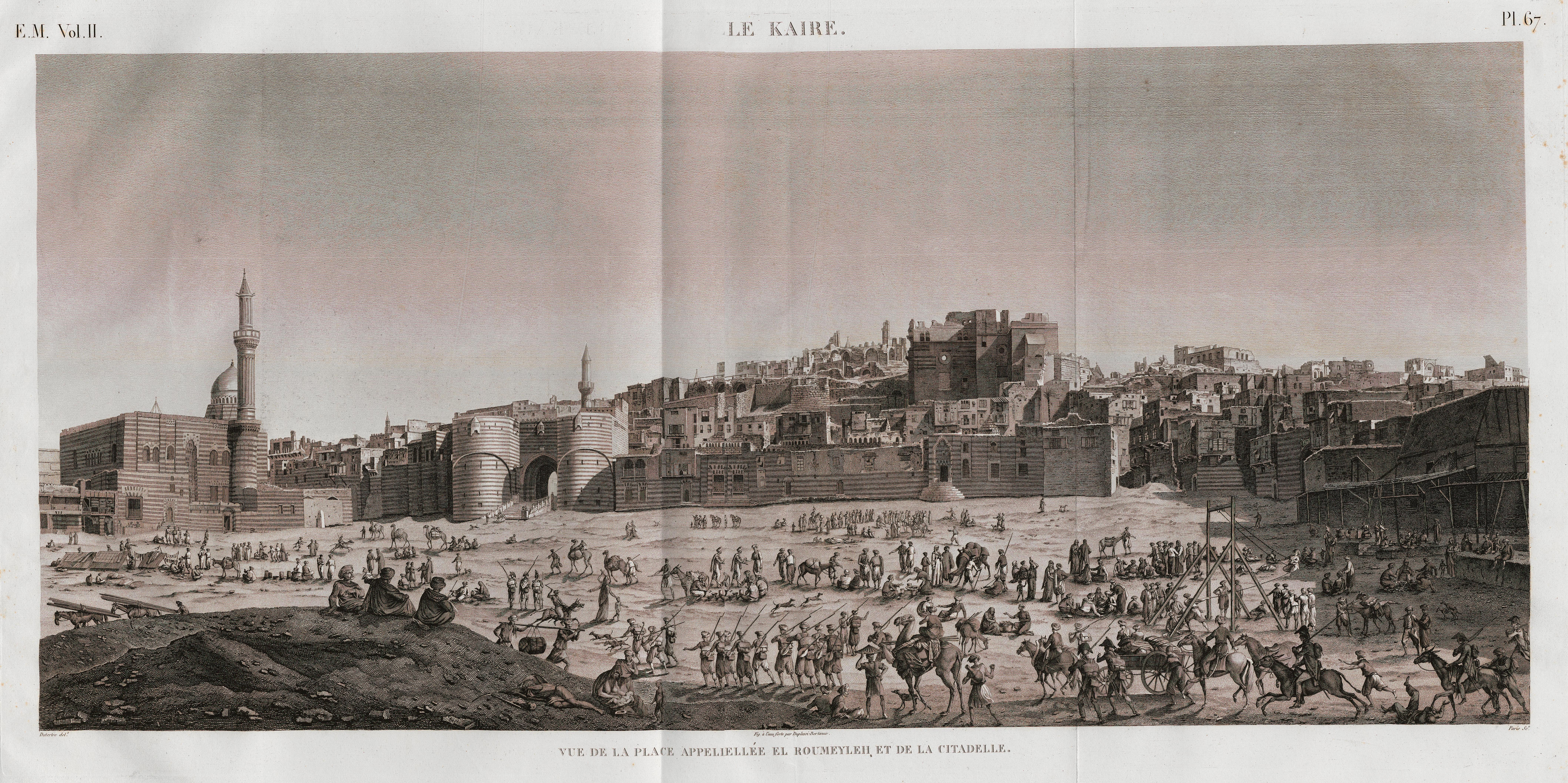
From the Description de l'Egypte, c.1800

The square had originally served as a polo court for Mamluk Sultan Al-Nasir Muhammad on Tuesdays and Saturdays, and as a venue for the prayers at the festivals for Eid al‑Fitr and Eid al‑Adha. It was also used as an area for receiving ambassadors and foreign dignitaries.

The square witnessed many Mamluk celebrations, and the Sultan's procession came out of the Citadel's seat of government, heading to the streets of Cairo on important occasions such as the exit of an army (army) for war. Or the exit of the bearer (the covering of the Kaaba) for the Hijaz or when celebrating the confirmation of the sighting of the crescent of Ramadan.

== Location ==
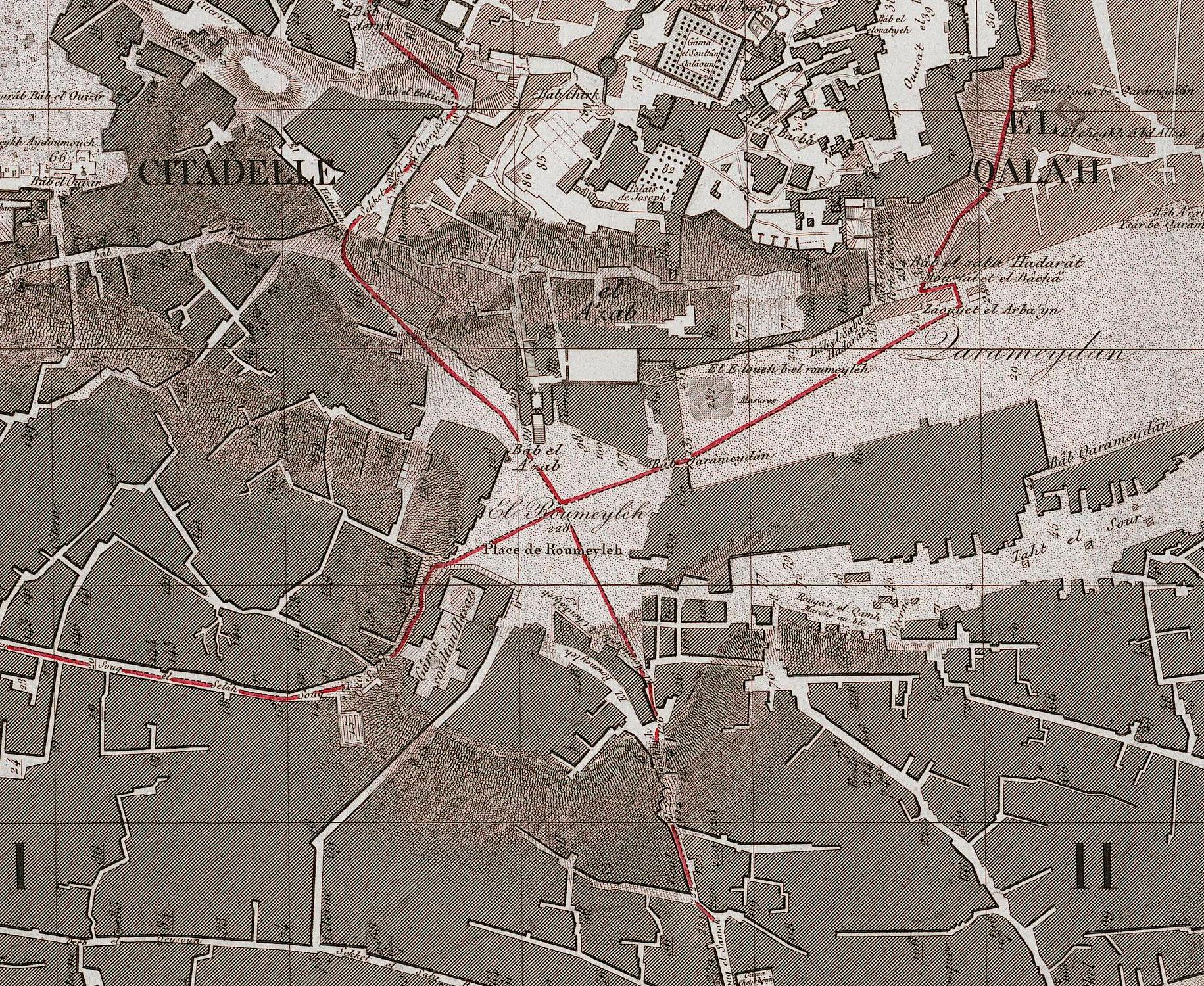
Salah ad-Din Square (Roumeyleh Square) in the Description de l'Egypte (north is to the left)

The square is surrounded by the Mosque-Madrasa of Sultan Hassan to the north, the Al-Mahmoudia Mosque to the east. The Al-Rifa'i Mosque, a 19th-century addition, contains the tombs of four 19th and 20th century Khedives and Kings of the Muhammad Ali dynasty.
