= Saliba Street =

Street in Cairo, Egypt

Coordinates: 30.030390°N 31.250865°E

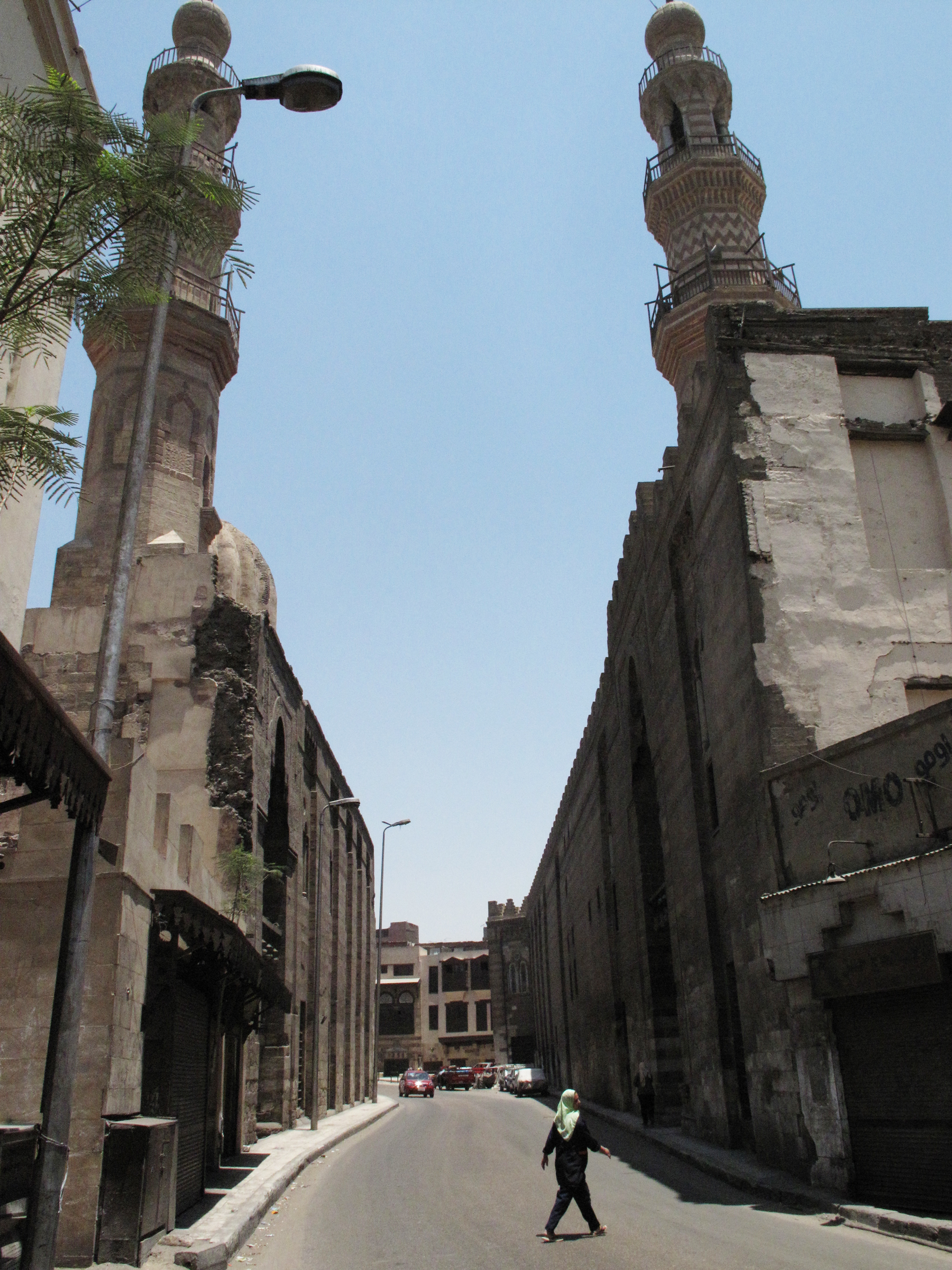
Saliba Street at the Mosque and Khanqah of Shaykhu

Al-Saliba Street (Arabic: شارع صليبة, lit. 'cross street') is one of the old main streets in Islamic Cairo, Egypt. It extends from Citadel Square to Sayyidah Zainab Square. The street has many buildings representative of medieval Islamic architecture, such as the Mosque of Ibn Tulun and Bayt al-Kritliyya, as well as schools, sabils (water fountains), gathering places, baths, and palaces.

== Monuments on the street ==
- Al-Sayeda Zainab Mosque
- Gayer-Anderson Museum
- Tomb of Salar and Sangar-al-Gawli
- Madrasa of Sarghatmish

== See also ==
- Muizz Street
- History of Egypt
