= Mosque-Madrasa of Sultan Hasan =

Mosque in Cairo, Egypt

- مسجد ومدرسة السلطان حسن
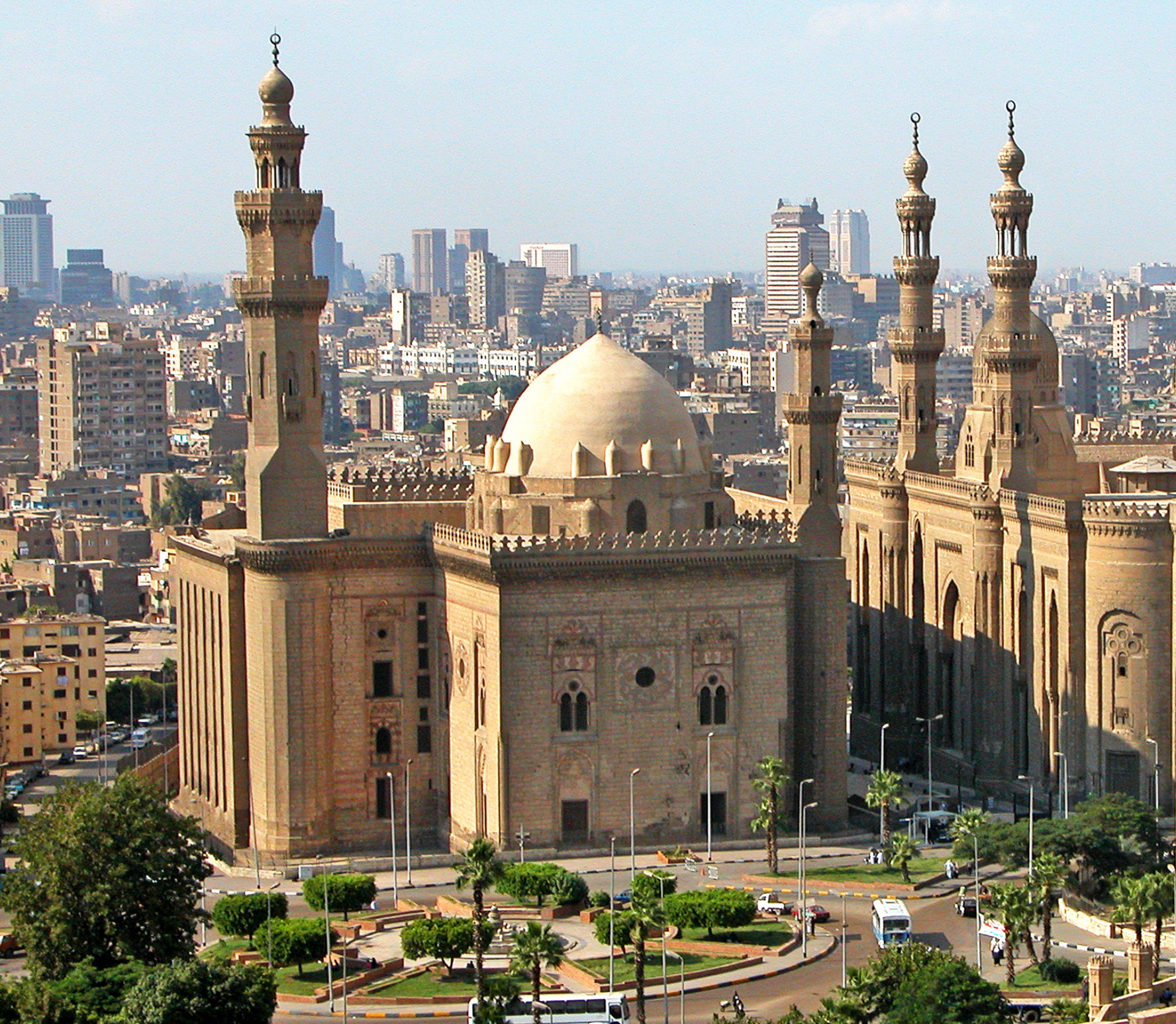
- The mosque in 2014, viewed from the Citadel

Religion
- Affiliation: Islam
- Ecclesiastical or organisational status: Mosque and madrasa
- Status: Active

Location
- Location: Salah al-Din Square, Islamic Cairo
- Country: Egypt
- Interactive map of Mosque-Madrasa of Sultan Hasan
- Coordinates: 30°01′55″N 31°15′24″E

Architecture
- Type: Mosque
- Style: Mamluk
- Founder: Sultan an-Nasir Hassan
- Groundbreaking: 1356 CE
- Completed: 1363 CE

Specifications
- Dome: 1
- Minaret: 2

UNESCO World Heritage Site
- Criteria: Cultural: (i)(v)(vi)
- Designated: 1979 (3rd session)
- Part of: Historic Cairo
- Reference no.: 89-002

The Mosque-Madrasa of Sultan Hasan (Arabic: مسجد ومدرسة السلطان حسن) is a monumental mosque and madrasa located in Salah al-Din Square in the historic district of Cairo, Egypt. It was built between 1356 and 1363 CE during the Bahri Mamluk period, commissioned by Sultan an-Nasir Hasan. The mosque was considered remarkable for its massive size and innovative architectural components, and is still considered one of the most impressive historic monuments in Cairo today.

== History ==
=== Patron and founder: Sultan Hasan ===
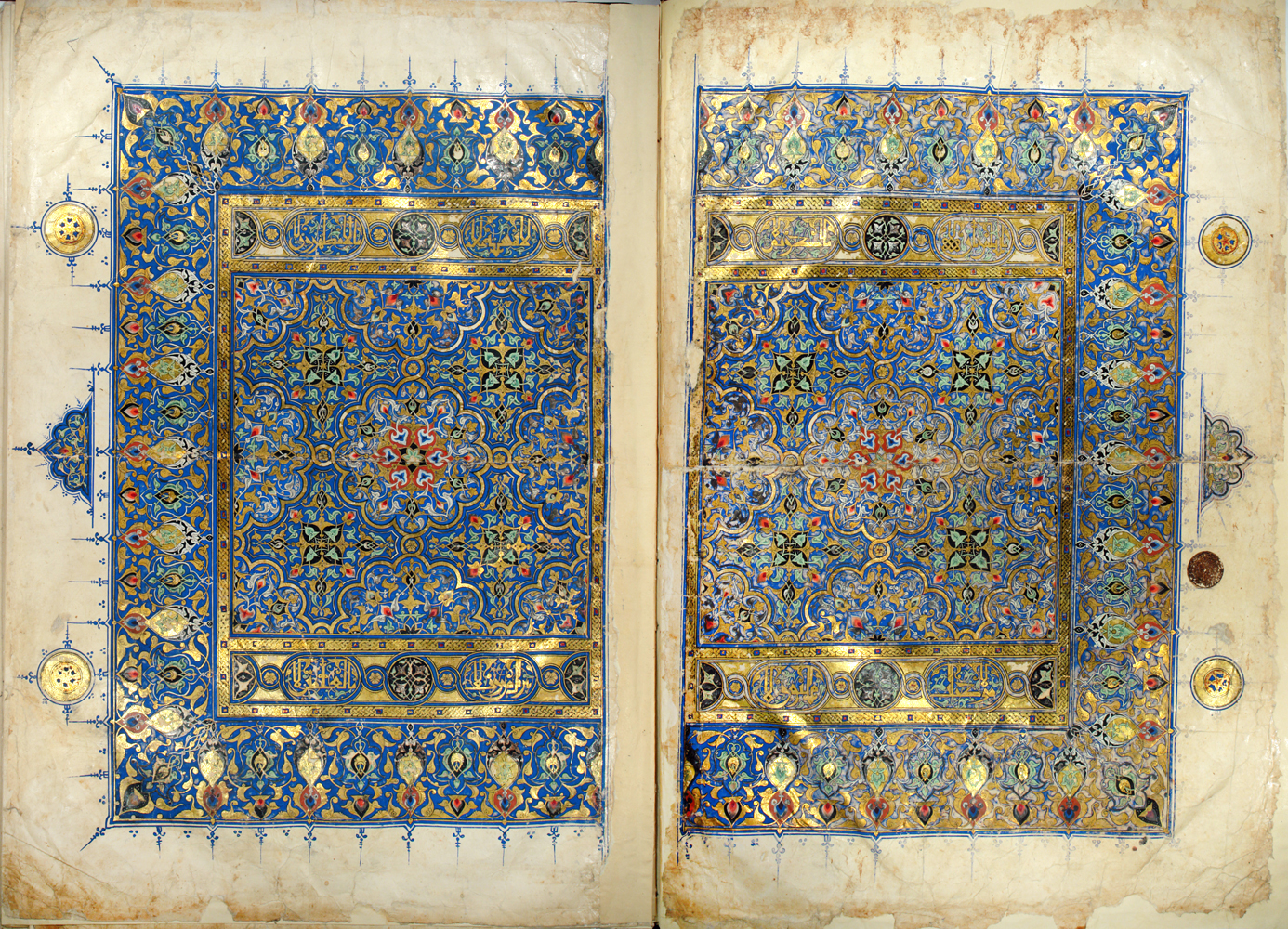
Illuminated frontispiece from the Qur'an commissioned by sultan Al-Hasan for his complex, now part of the National Library of Egypt's Collection of Mamluk Qur'an Manuscripts.

Sultan al-Nasir Hasan (full name: An-Nasir Badr ad-Din Hasan ibn Muhammad ibn Qalawun) ascended the throne at the age of 13 in 748 AH (1347/1348 CE). When he reached maturity in 1350, he arrested the Emir Manjaq who controlled all of the state's affairs. Prior to that arrest, the emir was restricted to an allowance of just one hundred dirham per day. This pocket change was collected by servants for the Sultan. It is especially striking considering that during that time, the emir Shaykhu was estimated to have an income of 200,000 dirham per day. This deprivation may be viewed as a prompt for his later extravagance. Upon taking over the reins, Sultan Hasan placed people of his own favor into positions of power. This happened at the expense of dignitaries currently in position; it upset many of them. Discontented Emirs arrested the Sultan in 1351, held him in jail for three years, and promoted his brother as-Salih Salih to the throne. Hasan spent his time in jail studying and his obituaries commented on his learning as a result. He returned to power and again reshuffled the ruling establishment attempting to solidify power, but Sultan Hasan was assassinated by his commander in chief of the army, Yalbugha al-Umari, a Mamluk thought to be loyal. Because of the Sultan's extravagance in spending fortunes on women and other forms of favoritism, the commander rebelled against the Sultan. A contemporary Syrian historian, Ibn Kathir, backed this reputation. Ibn Kathir blamed the sultan for his greed and squandering of public funds. The lavish expenses noted coincide with the Sultan's extensive mosque. After his assassination in 1361, Sultan Hasan's body was never found; the mausoleum never served its purpose.

=== Construction ===
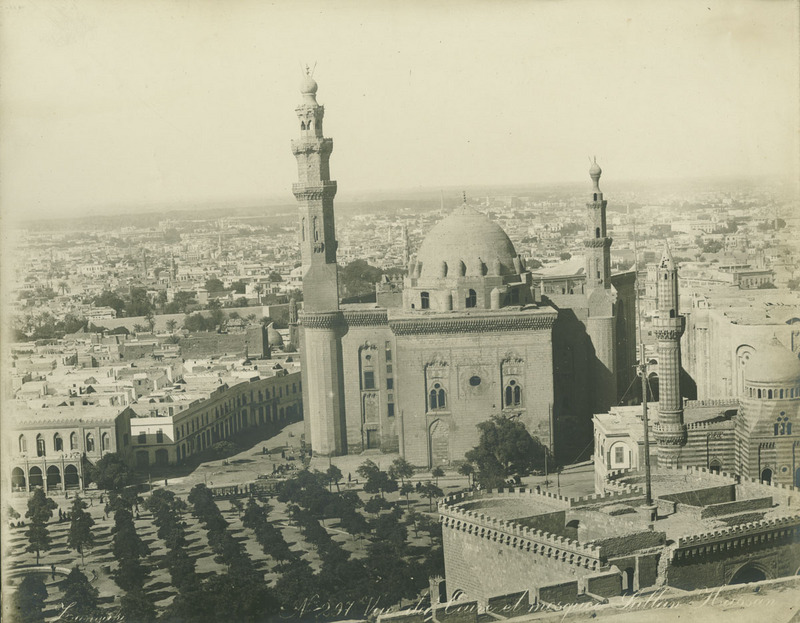
View of Sultan Hasan's mosque and of Rumayla Square in 1880

The mosque's construction is considered all the more remarkable as it coincided with the devastation wrought by the Black Plague, which struck Cairo repeatedly from the mid-14th century onwards. Its construction began in 1356 CE (757 AH) and work proceeded for three years "without even a single day of idleness". In fact, work appears to have continued even up to 1363, even after Sultan Hasan's death, before eventually ceasing. An inscription on the mosque notes the name of amir Muhammad ibn Biylik al-Muhsini as the supervisor of the construction of the mosque. Unusually, his name was placed near Sultan Hasan's in the inscription, which demonstrates how important the undertaking of the project must have been. The amir's high standing otherwise was another indication of this prestige, as he was appointed governor of Cairo in 1330 and oversaw other construction projects including the renovation of the hippodrome established by al-Zahir Baybars near the Citadel.

The most substantial available source concerning the mosque's construction is al-Maqrizi, writing six decades afterwards, as he had access to administrative documents that are unavailable to historians today. The manual labour needed for construction must have been partly depleted by the ongoing ravages of the plague, yet this does not appear to have been the main challenge. Maqrizi mentions that the construction of the mosque cost 30,000 dirham every day. The total construction costs amounted to over one million dinars, making it the most expensive mosque in medieval Cairo. Even the Sultan is said to have become discouraged at times by the cost of the project. Financing for the mosque was made possible by a few factors: first, the austerity measures implemented by Manjaq, one of the amirs in charge of state affairs before Sultan Hasan reached maturity; secondly, the influx of wealth to the state caused by the plague-related deaths of many Mamluk amirs whose properties were subsequently transferred to the state treasury, including the enormous wealth of amir Shaykhu; and thirdly, through extortion of the sultan's subjects during his reign.

The importance and scale of the building project also attracted craftsmen from all over the Mamluk empire, including the far-away provinces of Anatolia, which may explain the diversity and innovativeness of the mosque's design and decoration. It is also believed that limestone from the Pyramids of Giza was quarried for use in the mosque's construction.

=== Later events ===
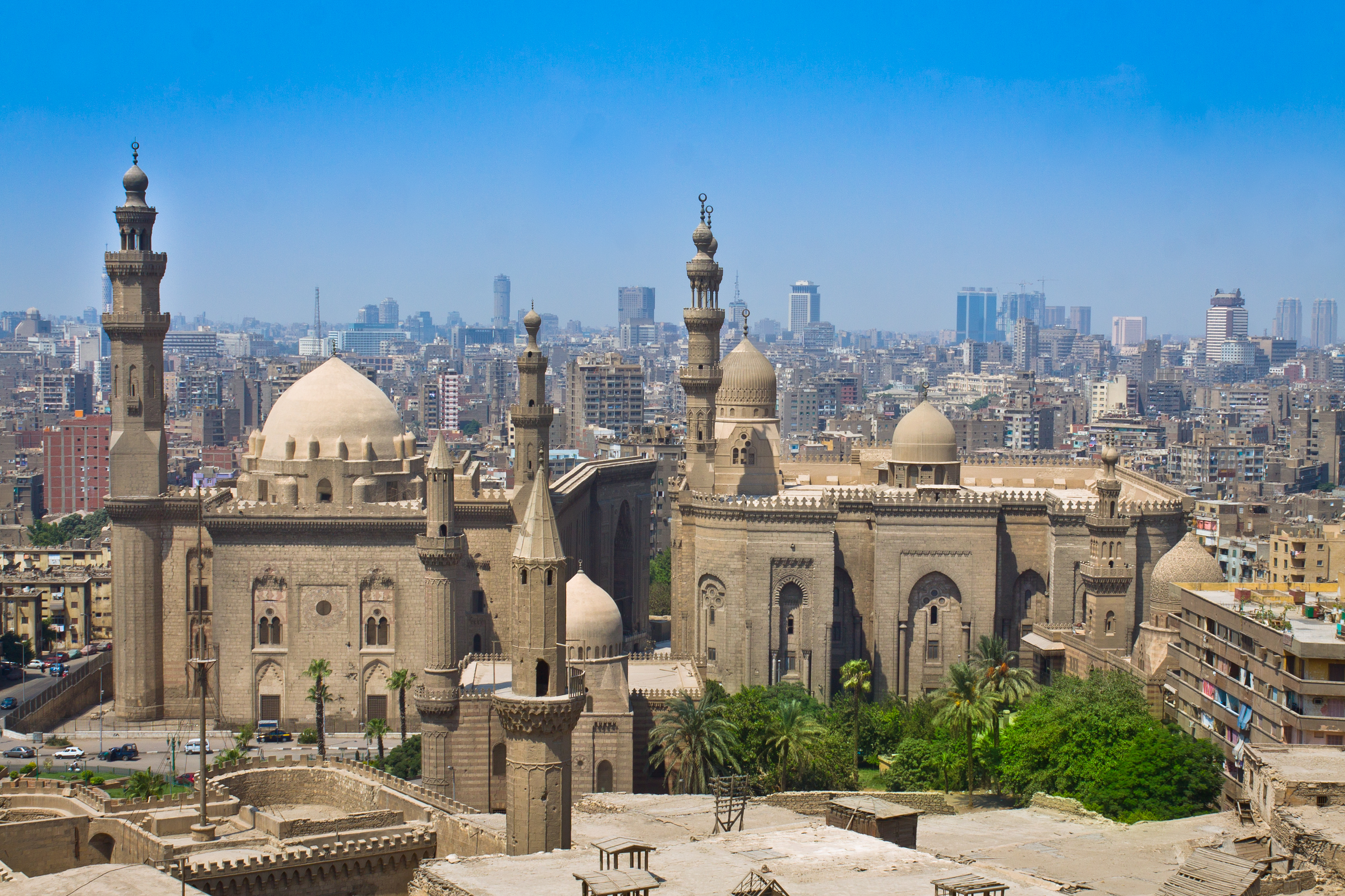
The mosque-madrasa-mausoleum of Sultan Hasan today, as seen from the Citadel. (The other large mosque on the right is the al-Rif'ai Mosque.)

Due to the mosque's location near the Citadel and because of its massive and sturdy construction, it was used on more than one occasion as a fortified position or as a platform from which to launch attacks on the Citadel. Al-Maqrizi, noted that "as soon as there occurred strife between the people the state, a number of amirs and others ascended to the top of the mosque and began to bombard the Citadel from there". This, in turn, persuaded more than one sultan to order the mosque to be demolished or blocked up. In 1391, rebel amirs against Sultan Barquq mounted the roof of the mosque and launched projectiles at the Citadel, provoking the sultan into ordering the stairs and platform of the entrance destroyed and the doorway boarded up. In 1500, Sultan Janbalat, anticipating another rebel attack from the mosque, ordered it demolished; however, after three days of unsuccessful demolition attempts on the mosque's southeastern (Citadel-facing) walls, he was forced to give up. In 1517, the very last Mamluk sultan, Tumanbay, took refuge inside the mosque in an attempt to evade capture by the victorious Ottoman army as it took control of Cairo, resulting in the Ottomans bombarding the mosque with cannonballs from the Citadel. In 1660, chronicles described the mausoleum's dome as still being full of holes made by cannonballs. Even in the 18th century, during the period of Ottoman control, the mosque was apparently closed for many years after unrest in 1736, and was only reopened in 1786 by order of Salim Agha. Some of these demolition attempts, however, drew criticism from Cairo's population and authorities were often subsequently pressured into repairing damages.

In 1659, the northern minaret attached to the mausoleum collapsed. In 1671-1672, the minaret was replaced with a smaller one, with a slightly different form, and at same time the original wooden dome of the mausoleum was replaced with the current dome, also in a different shape from the original.

In 1869, construction began on a monumental new mosque, the Mosque of ar-Rifa'i, right next to the existing mosque of Sultan Hasan. Completed in 1912, its size is comparable to Sultan Hasan's construction and it was built in a neo-Mamluk style. The two buildings together now dominate the old Rumayla Square (now renamed Midan Salah ad-Din) across from the Citadel.

== Architectural description ==
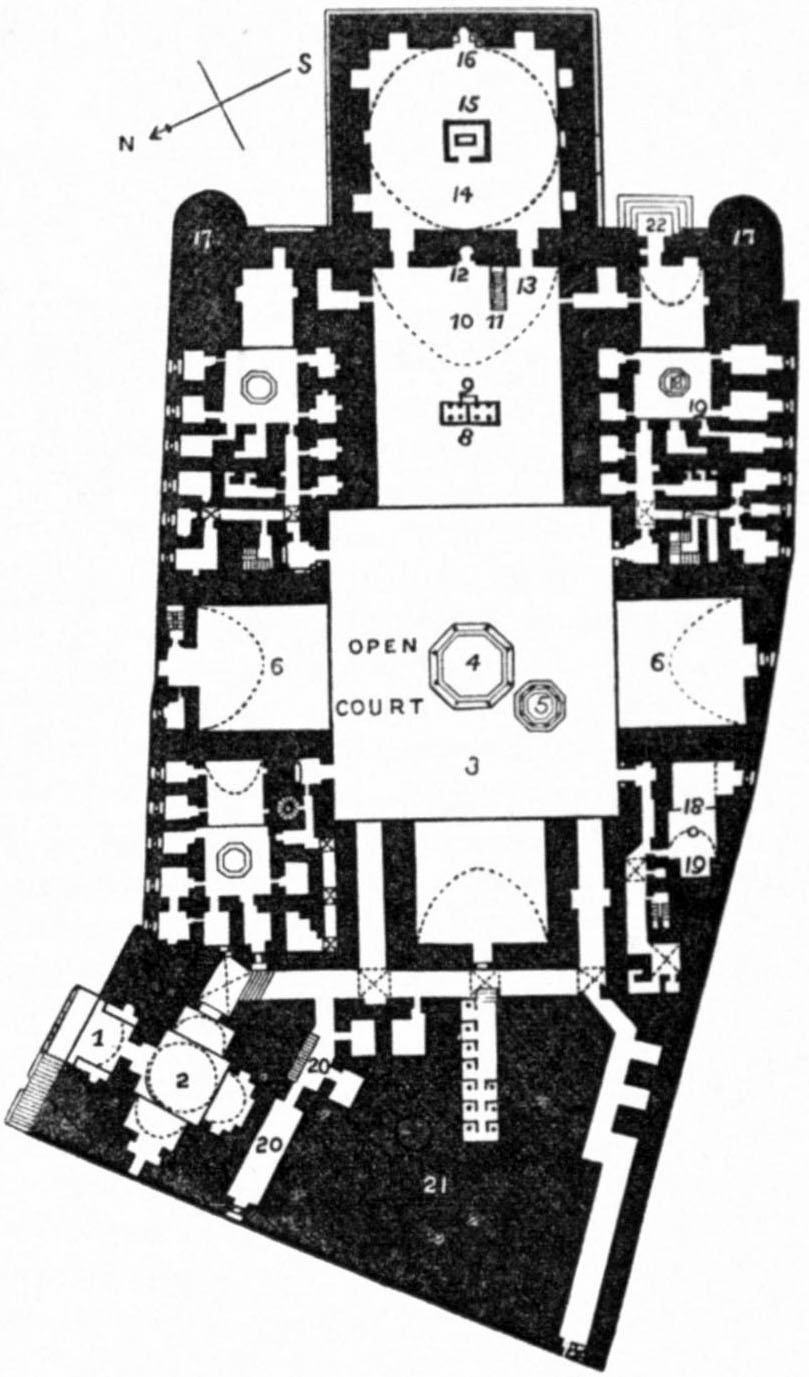
Floor plan of the mosque-madrasa. At the middle is the large central courtyard. The mausoleum is at the top (southeastern) end. The entrance is at the bottom-left (northeastern) corner. The smaller passages and rooms at the corners of the main courtyard are part of the specialized madrasas.

=== The site ===
The mosque occupies almost 8000 square meters in a location close to the Citadel of Cairo. It stands on the site of a lavish palace which had previously been built at great cost by Hasan's father, Sultan al-Nasir Muhammad, for one of his amirs, Yalbugha al-Yahawi, and which was demolished to make way for the mosque. The construction of monumental buildings on this location was likely meant in part to create a pleasing sight for the Sultan to look down on from his palace in the Citadel.

During the medieval era, an open square, known as Rumayla, lay between the mosque and the Citadel. Today, the square is occupied by a large traffic circle and has been renamed Salah ad-Din Square. The square and the former hippodrome nearby (on the southwestern side of the Citadel) were historically used for military parades, equestrian games, and official ceremonies, thus giving the location added symbolic significance.

=== Exterior ===
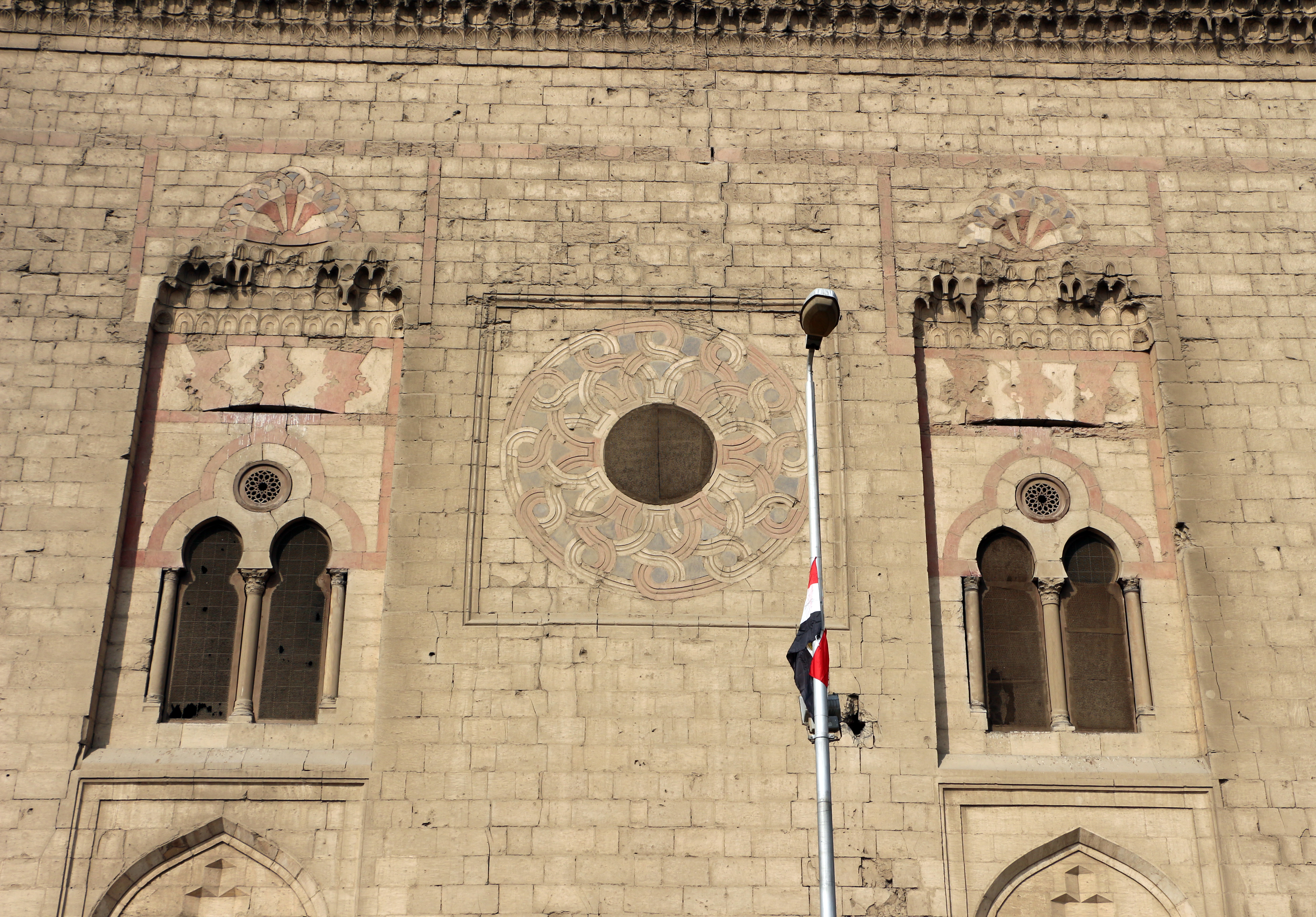
Exterior facade of the mausoleum

The building is about 150 meters long, 68 meters wide, and 36 meters high. Like all mosques, it is oriented towards Mecca, which is to the southeast of Cairo. The building's southwestern and northeastern facades (its longer sides) are marked by vertical rows of eight windows each (spread across four stories inside) which are a unique feature that helps to visually emphasize the structure's height. The top edge of the exterior facades are crowned by a thick cornice of muqarnas (stalactite-like carving) projecting 1.5 meters over the rest of the wall, another unprecedented feature in Mamluk architecture, although it does not extend around the entire building. (Note: Whether this is by design, or because it was damaged or never finished, is not specified in the sources consulted here.) Likewise, a crest of fleur-de-lis-shaped crenellations also ran along the whole length at the very top edge of the walls, but today it is only preserved around the mausoleum's walls on the southeastern side. The southeastern or Citadel-facing walls of the mosque and mausoleum have windows framed by more elaborate stone decoration in various patterns. The triangular-shaped spaces above the bottom windows here were once filled with geometric ceramic decoration, possibly of Anatolian Turkish inspiration.

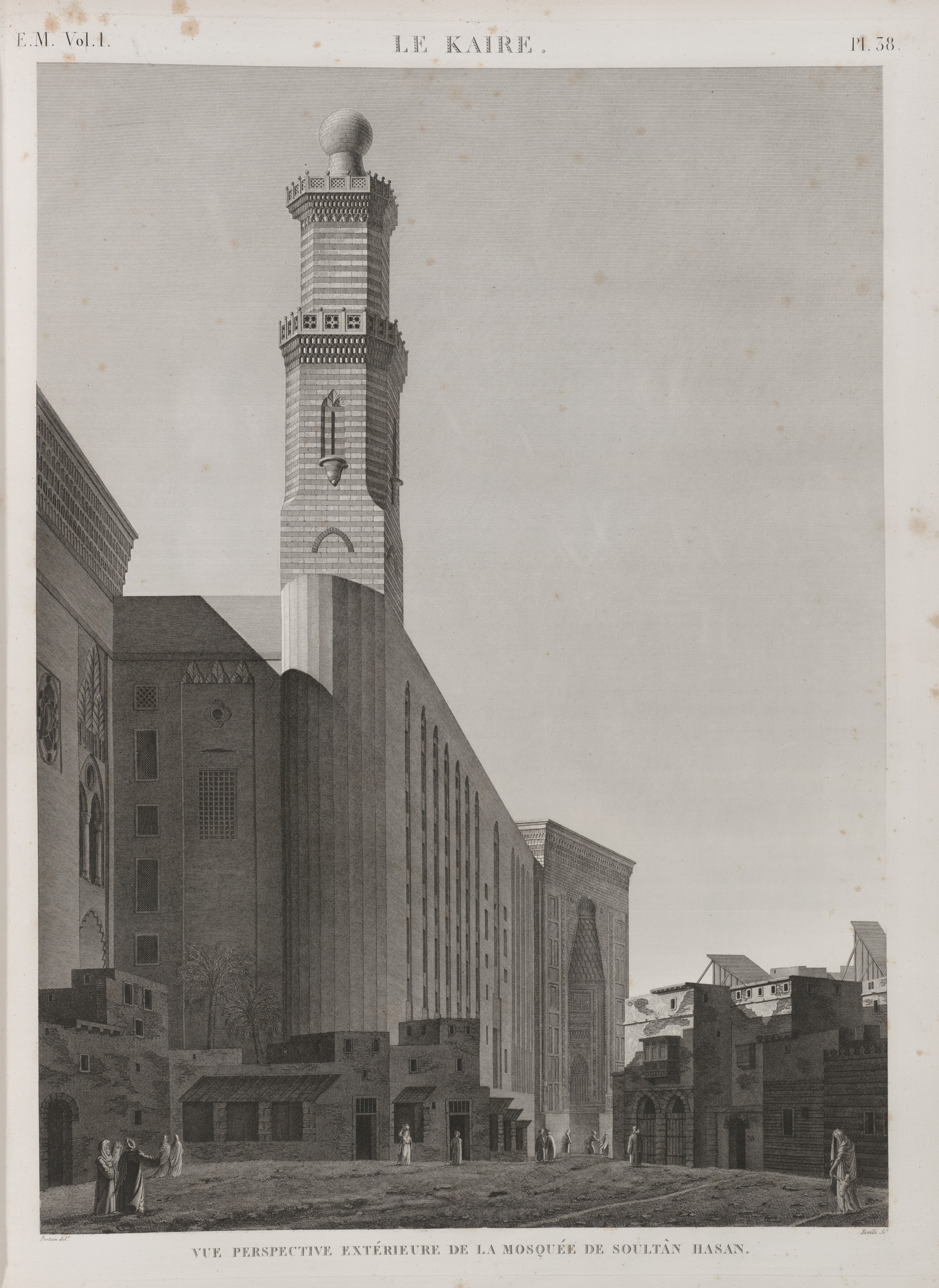
The entrance façade in c.1800

Near the bottom of the southwestern wall, below today's street level, is a row of stone corbels projecting from the wall which likely served to support the roof of a covered market along the street on this side.

==== The minarets ====
The mosque today has two minarets flanking the mausoleum chamber on the southeastern side of the structure. The southern one of this pair, which is still in its original form, is the highest minaret of Mamluk architecture, its summit being 84 meters above the street level at the time. The northern one collapsed in 1659 and was rebuilt in its current form in 1671-72. The original northern minaret was said to be more monumental, and its summit was "double-headed"; in other words, it culminated in two lantern structures (instead of the usual one), a feature that reappeared much later in the minaret of Sultan al-Ghuri at the al-Azhar Mosque and in the minaret of the nearby Mosque of Qanibay ar-Rammah.

Additionally, two more minarets were originally intended to stand above the monumental portal of the mosque, very much like in the architecture of Mongol Ilkhanid and Anatolian Seljuk madrasas and mosques around the same period (for example, the Gök Madrasa in Sivas, Turkey, or the Great Mosque of Yazd, Iran), which were almost certainly an inspiration. This would have given the mosque a total of four minarets, which would have been unprecedented in Islamic architecture in Egypt. However, in 1361, during construction, one of those minarets toppled and killed around 300 people, including children in the primary school below. After this, the builders abandoned their construction, leaving only the two minarets adjacent to the mausoleum that we see today.

==== The entrance portal ====
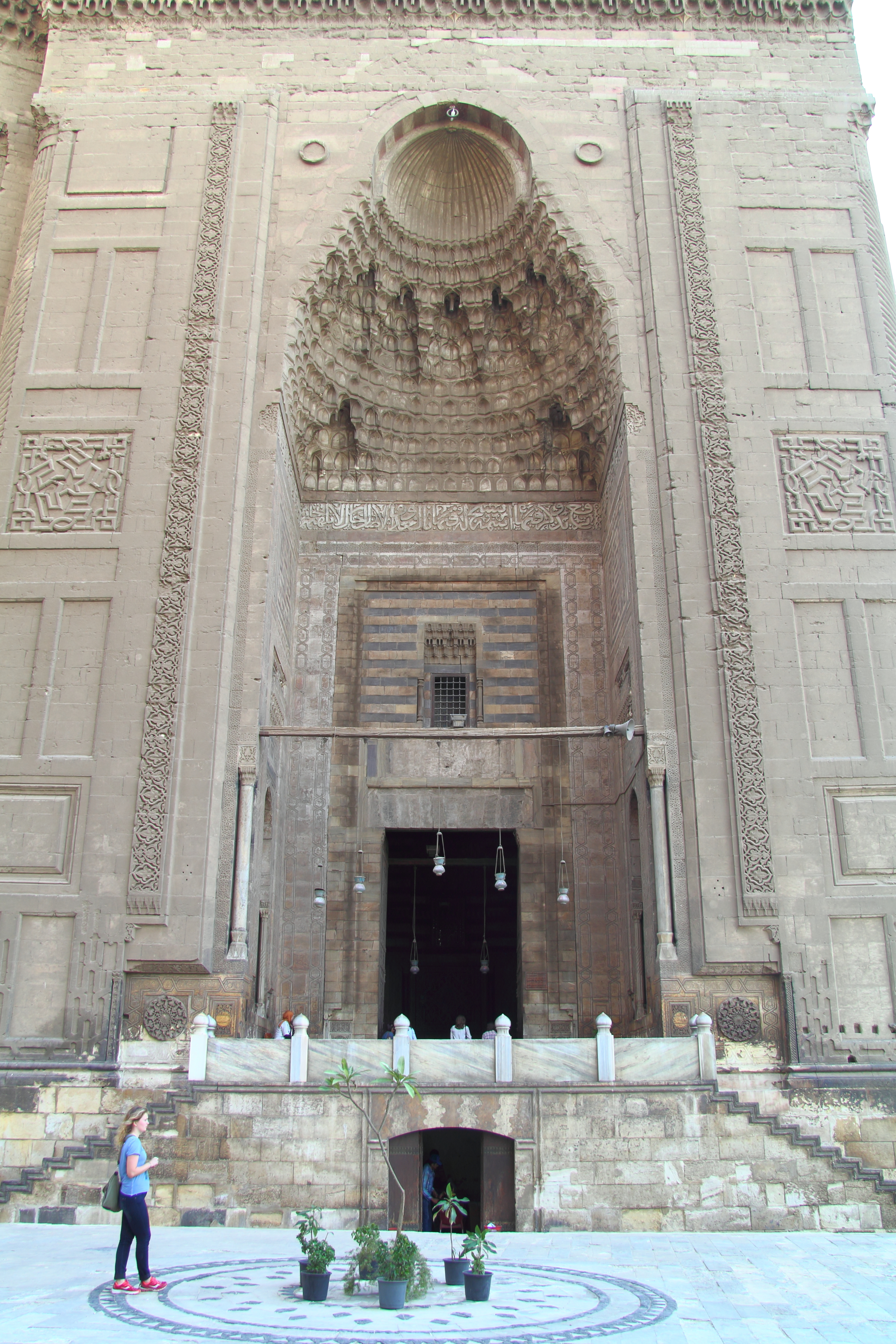
The entrance portal

The entrance portal is gigantic by the standards of mosque architecture and is 38 meters high. It was built at an angle projecting 17 degrees outwards from the rest of the wall so as to be visible from the Citadel. Its shape and the layout of its decoration indicate obvious inspiration from the portals of madrasas and mosques in Anatolian Seljuk and Mongol Ilkhanid architecture of the time, particularly the portal of the Gök (Blue) Madrasa in Sivas, Turkey, built in 1271. On the inside of the portal, behind the stone benches and flanking the doorway, are a pair of marble niches filled with geometric patterns reminiscent of Qur'an illumination and culminating in shallow muqarnas hoods (also Anatolian in style). Above these are black marble panels inlaid with white Kufic Arabic inscriptions of parts of the Surat al-Fath (Sura of Victory) from the Qur'an. The Shahada (the Muslim declaration of faith) is inscribed in "square" Kufic higher up above this, while further up is a band of inscription containing another Quranic verse (24:36-37), running along the full width of the inside of the portal, just below the muqarnas canopy.

The decoration of the portal was apparently never finished. There are many examples of stone carvings whose initial outlines were drawn into the stone but were never carved out. The broad and impressive muqarnas canopy over the doorway does not appear to be fully carved out either, while above this a section of stone cladding appears to be missing. Other bands of stone-carved decoration were only partially executed. For example, at the foot of the decorative niche on the left side of the portal one arabesque medallion was carved on the left while the one on the right was not. (This is also a rare demonstration of the steps in the stone-carving process: it is likely that a master craftsman drew the outlines of the pattern into the stone and that apprentices were later responsible for carving it out; in this case, the second step was not completed.) Some of the carved patterns, even if unfinished, are themselves notable; for example, there are floral chinoiserie motifs here which appear in other Mamluk crafts of the time but do not appear anywhere else in Mamluk architecture. Another minor but curious feature is the sculpted image of other architectural buildings in some of the carvings just above the stairs leading up to the portal; these are possibly spoils from a Gothic-style Christian monument, presumably from Crusader churches located on the estates donated to the madrasa-mosque's foundation.

The original bronze-covered doors of the entrance were forcibly purchased at a modest price by Sultan Mu'ayyad in the early 15th century for use on his own mosque, and can still be seen there today.

=== Interior ===
Although the exterior walls of the building are in stone, much of the interior is brick, with facades covered in stucco and finished with stonework for decorative details.

==== The entrance vestibule ====
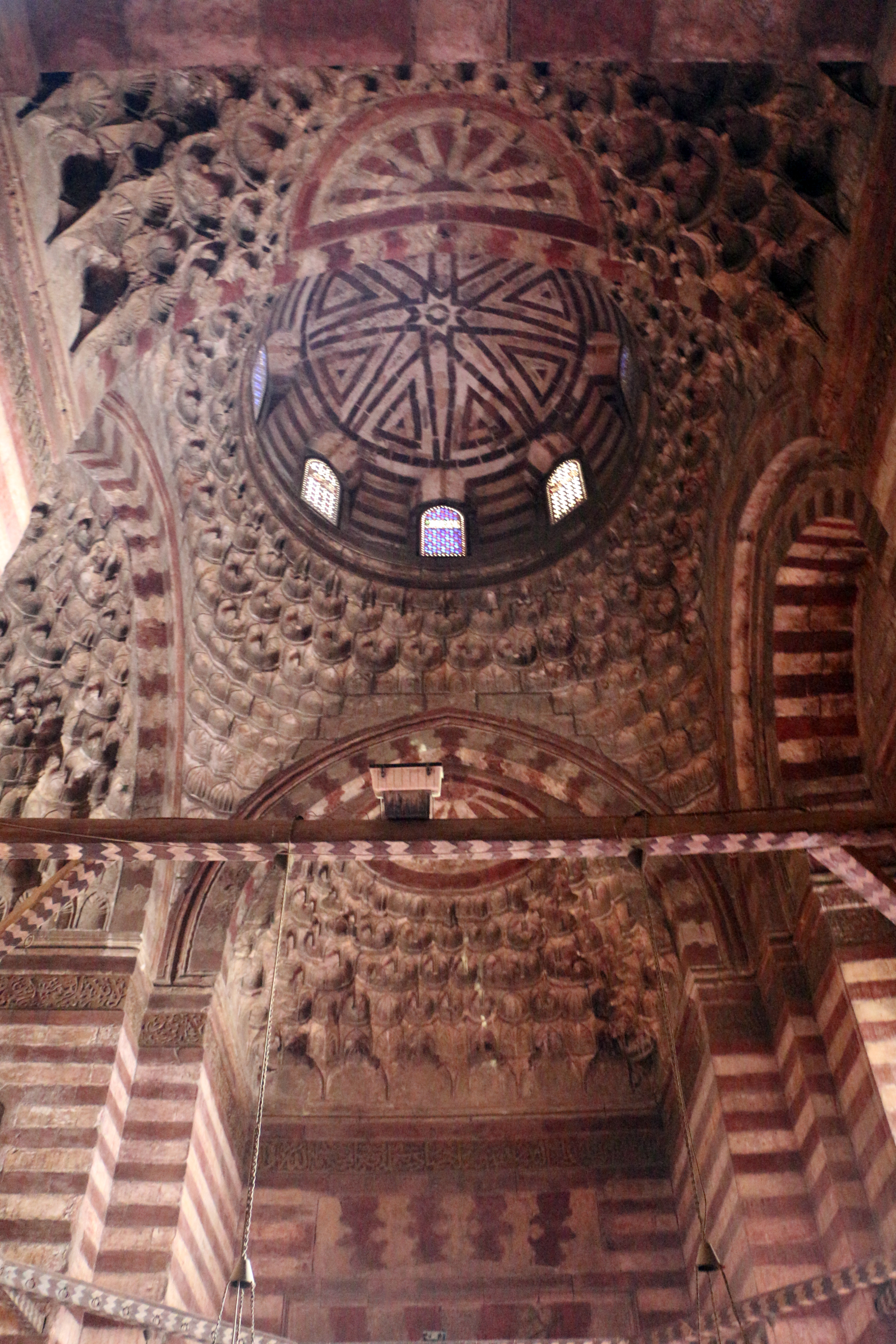
The vestibule chamber, with dome and muqarnas vaulting, as well as ablaq stonework

The vestibule chamber upon entering the mosque is an unusually ornate space, covered by a small central dome surrounded by elaborate muqarnas vaults. The dome and half-dome arrangement here is reminiscent of Byzantine architecture, but may have been inspired from Armenian craftsmanship, if not original. The back wall facing the doorway is covered in marble paneling: in the middle is a square panel made of inlaid white and red marble in a geometric pattern of Syrian style, while on either side are marble panels with other carved patterns. From this chamber, a bending passage leads to the central courtyard.

Also located behind the walls of the vestibule on the floor plan is a space which may have once housed, or was intended to house, a doctor and medical students, as mentioned in the foundation (waqf) document. The space is now ruined, or might have never been finished.

==== The central courtyard and mosque area ====
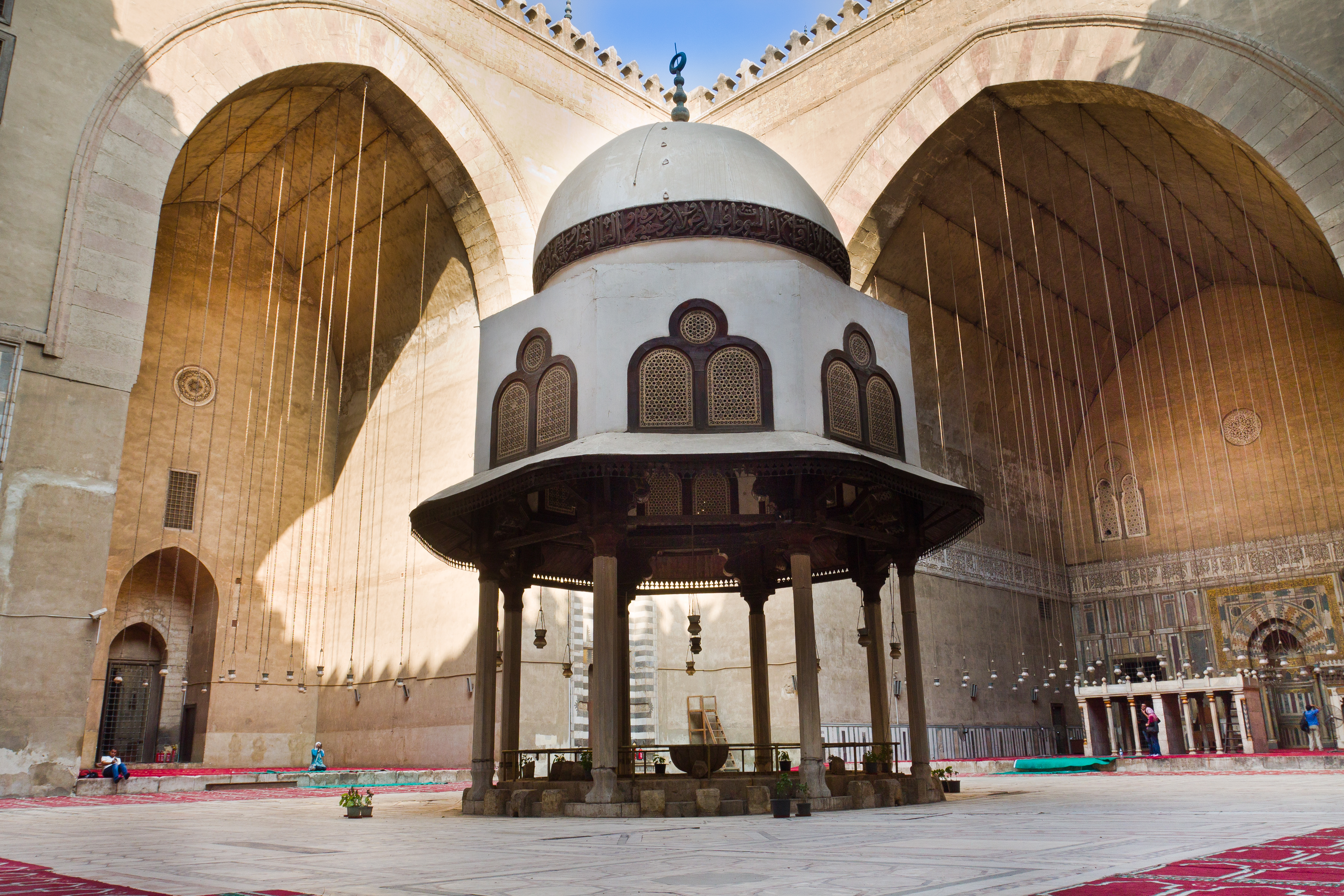
The central courtyard with an ablutions fountain in the middle, surrounded by four monumental iwans

The enormous central courtyard is a vast square space surrounded by four monumental iwans (vaulted chambers open on one side), of which the qibla iwan (the iwan in the direction of prayer) is larger than the other three. This space acted as a Friday mosque accessible to the public, but it was also used for teaching by the madrasas that were part of the foundation. The four iwans are said to have each been devoted to the teaching of one of the four maddhabs (schools of thought) of Sunni Islamic jurisprudence: the Hanafi, Hanbali, Maliki, and Shafi'i maddhabs.

The size of the main qibla iwan was frequently acknowledged as an awe-inspiring achievement, with Mamluk historians like Maqrizi claiming it was greater than the famous arch of the Sassanid Persian palace of Ctesiphon (still the largest single-span vault of brickwork in the world today). The iwan of Sultan Hasan's mosque is not actually as large as that arch, but the comparison nonetheless emphasized the building's legendary reputation. This iwan is also richly decorated. A monumental inscription in Kufic style, set against a swirling vegetal arabesque background, runs along the entire length of the iwan and is unique in Mamluk architecture. The text is a fragment of the Surat al-Fath (Sura of Victory) from the Qur'an. Below this inscription band, the qibla wall is covered in multicolored marble paneling, centered around the mihrab (the niche symbolizing the direction of prayer) which is framed by its own golden inscription and whose central half-dome hood features a sunrise motif radiating from the word "Allah". The stone and marble minbar (pulpit) next to it may have once been covered in inlaid geometric patterns like that on the minbar of the Mosque of Aqsunqur, but this is not visible today. The minbar does still feature finely crafted bronze doors with geometric patterns. A dado of marble also runs along the other two walls of the iwan, although at a much shorter height. A stone platform, known as a dikka, stands in the middle of the space and was where reciters of the Qur'an would recite aloud for communal prayers.

The other three iwans and the rest of the courtyard are largely plain except for the doorways at the corners of the courtyard. These doorways lead to the madrasa units each with its own smaller courtyards. They are framed in ablaq stonework, bands of stone inscriptions, and colored mosaics. It is possible that the other iwans were intended to be decorated too but were never finished. Additionally, a marked-out but empty band running along the top edge of the entire courtyard, above the iwans, may have been intended for another monumental inscription.

The floor of the central courtyard is paved in rich marble mosaics. The pavement dates from a restoration by the "Comité" in 1912, but the patterns may well be from Sultan Hasan's time. The domed pavilion at the center of the courtyard shelters an ablutions fountain (for washing before prayer), but it was originally meant to be only a decorative fountain (ablutions facilities were once located next to the mosque building). The domed structure itself is made of wood and has likely been repaired or restored many times. Its current shape may date from Ottoman times, but it may also be the earliest Mamluk example of this type of fountain.

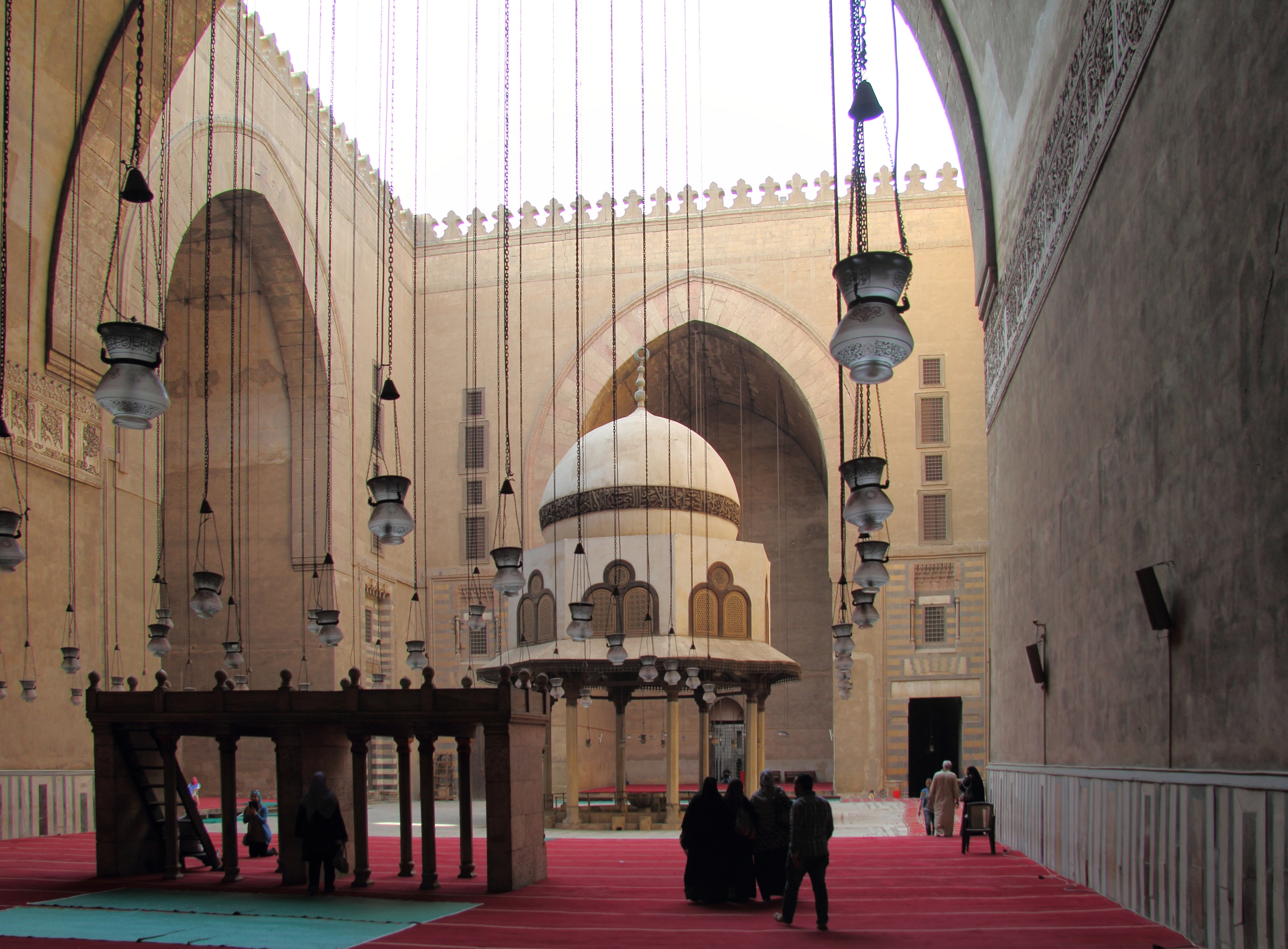
Interior of the mosque, seen from the qibla iwan

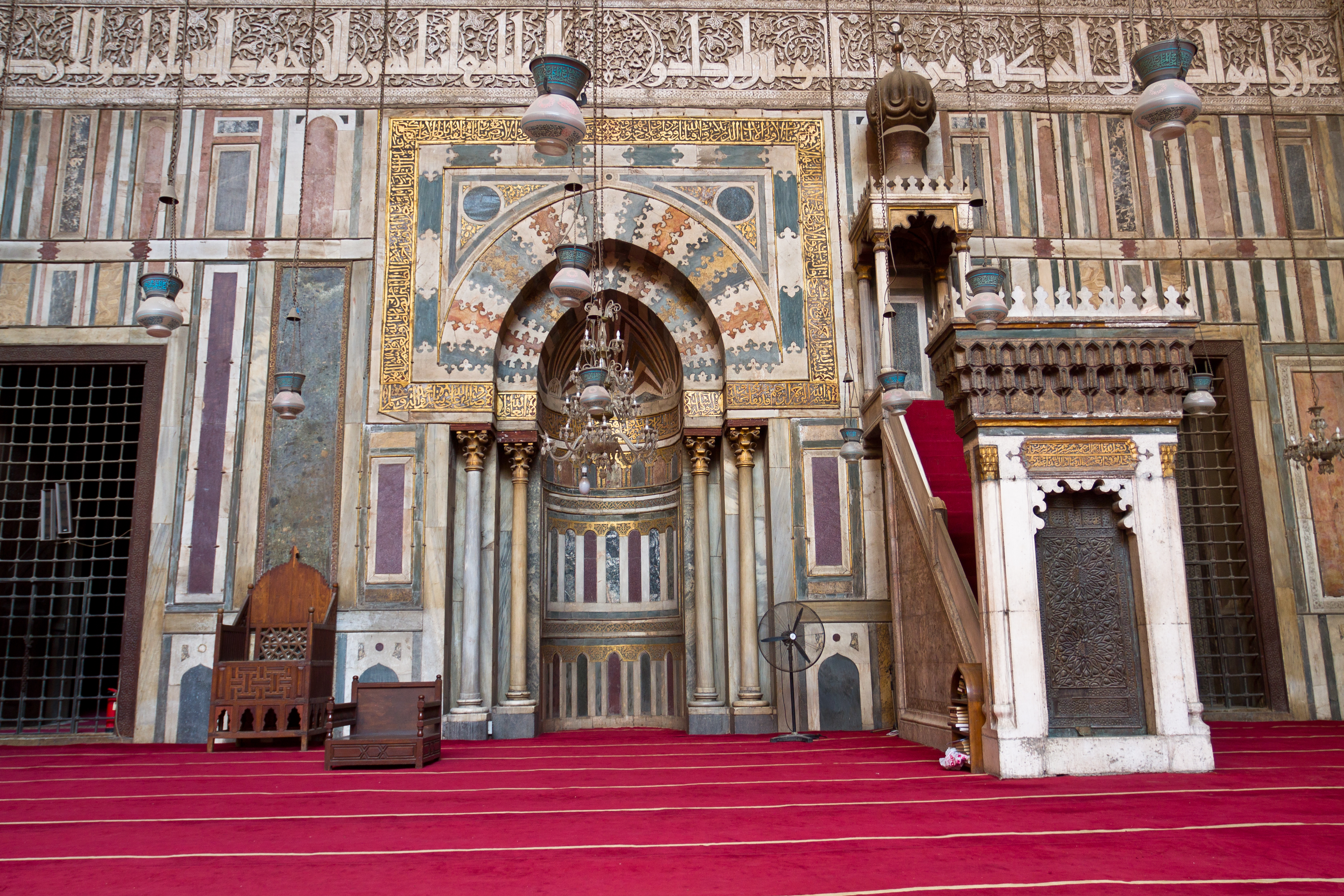
The mihrab (center) and minbar (right)

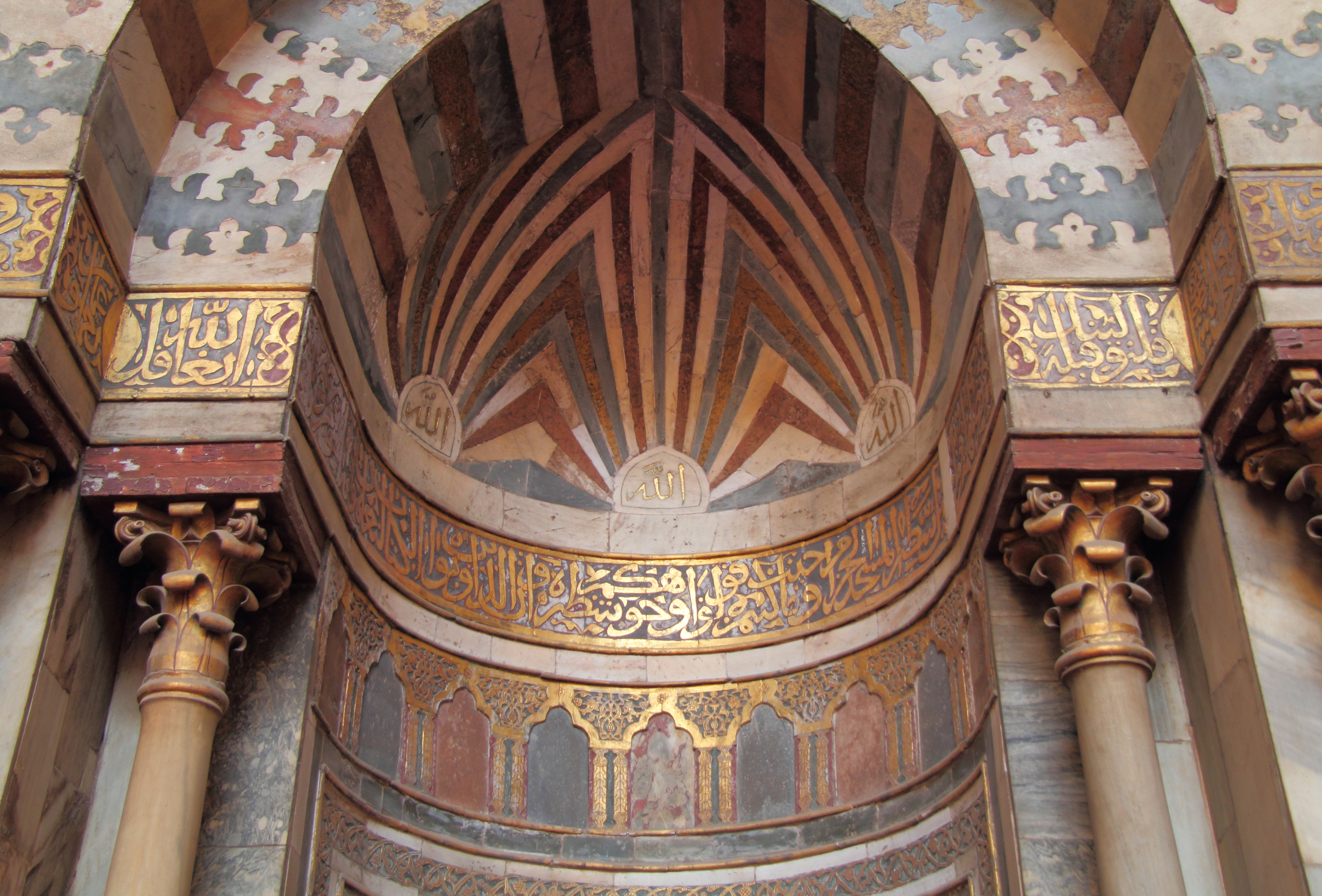
Close-up of the hood of the mihrab

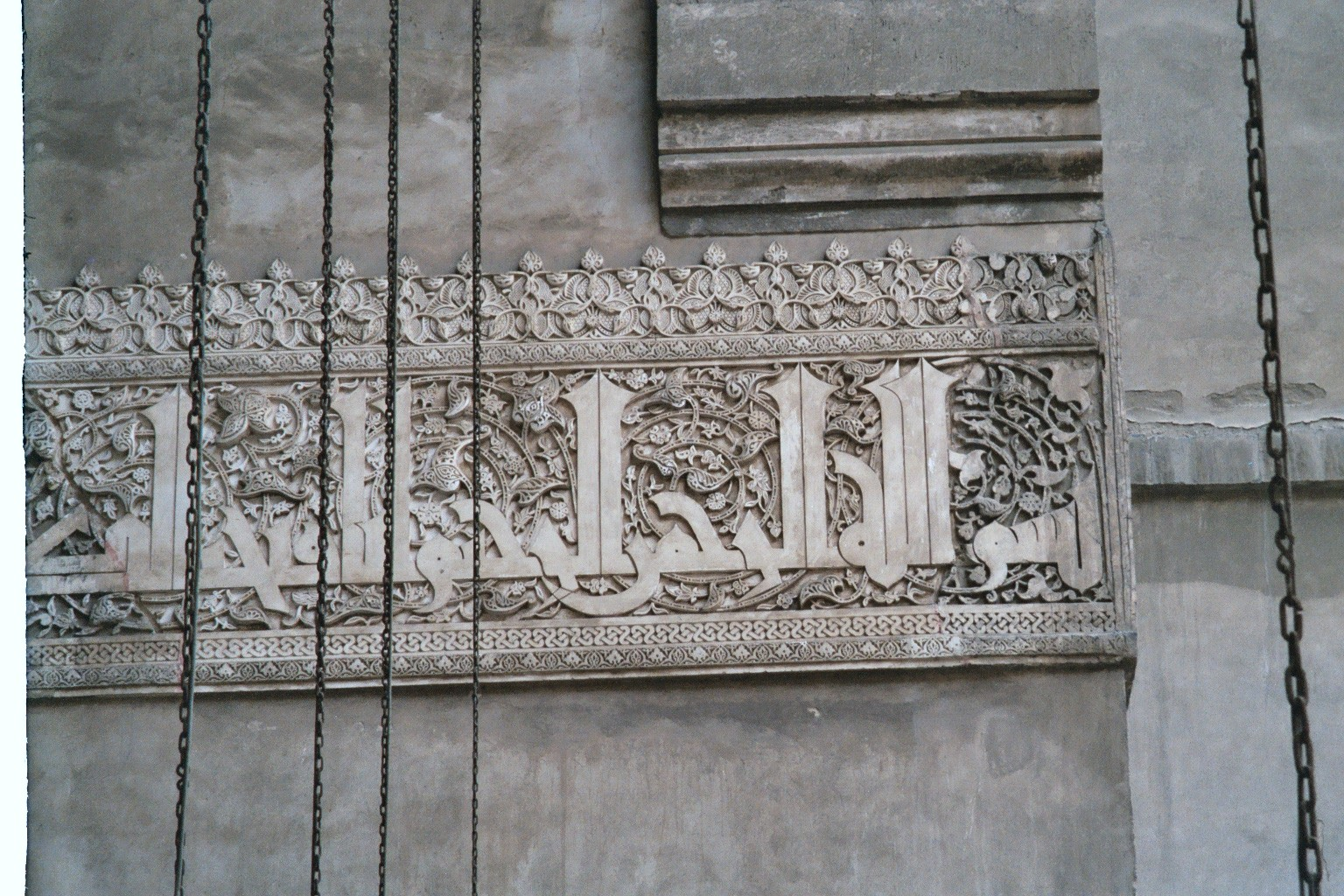
The Kufic inscription band in the qibla iwan

==== The madrasa courtyards ====
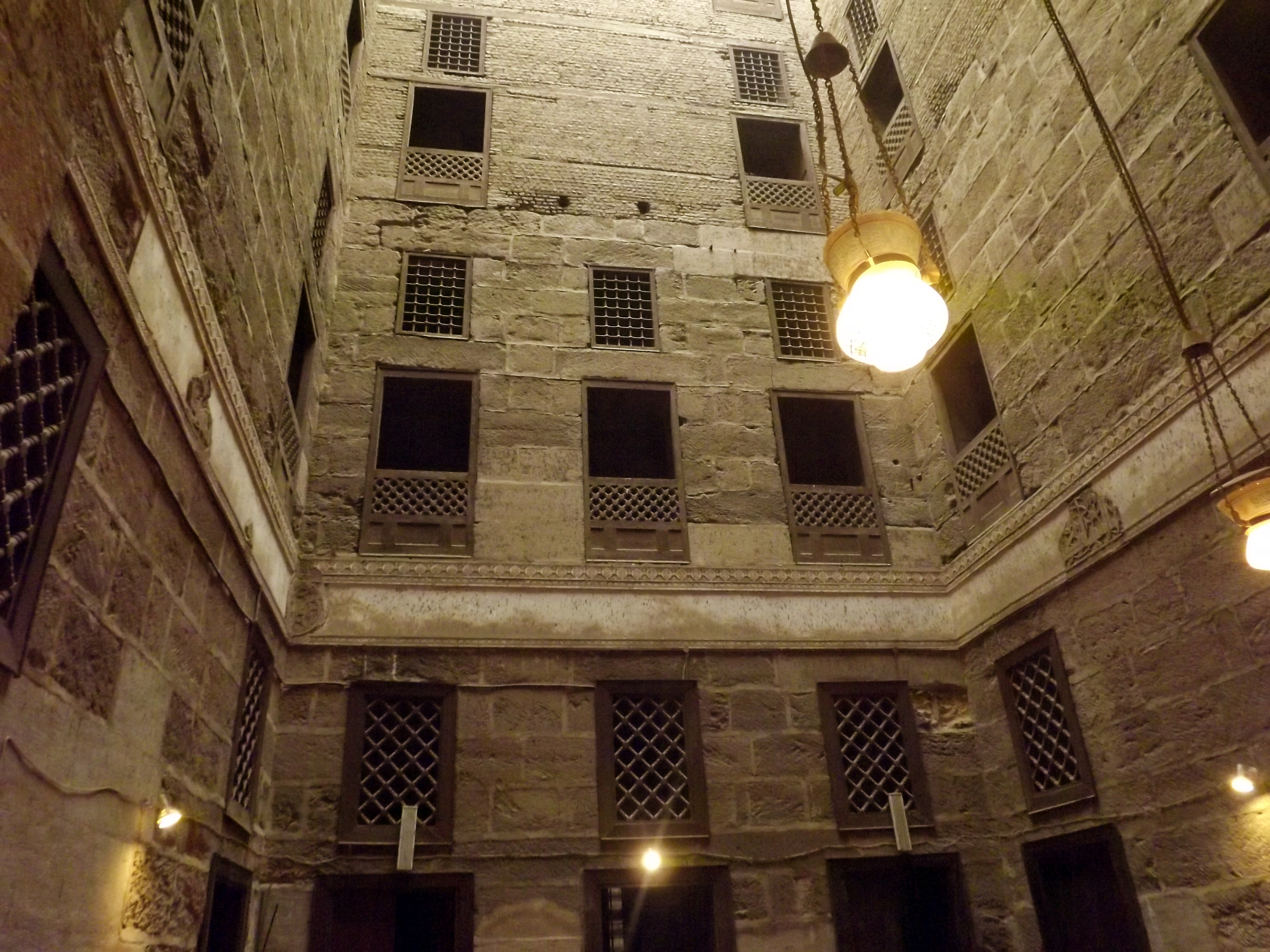
A courtyard of one of the madrasas behind the walls of the main courtyard

The doors in the corners of the main courtyard each lead to one of the four madrasa devoted to one of the four maddhabs (schools of thought in Sunni Islamic jurisprudence). Each was centered on a small courtyard surrounded by four stories of living quarters and cells for students. The madrasas were not of equal size (at least in part because of the irregular floor plan of the mosque, which was limited by existing streets and structures), with the Hanafi and Shafi'i madrasas being the largest, located on either side of the great iwan of the main mosque.

These madrasa areas were almost entirely separate from the central courtyard (aside from the doorways leading to them), unlike in other madrasas where the rooms of the students often had windows overlooking the main courtyard. This may have been because the main courtyard was used as a mosque by members of the public and a greater measure of privacy or tranquility was desired for the students. Each madrasa courtyard also had its own smaller iwan used for prayers and oriented towards the qibla (direction of prayer), which was decorated by a stucco inscription band much like the one in the great qibla-side iwan of the main mosque.

==== The mausoleum and the dome ====
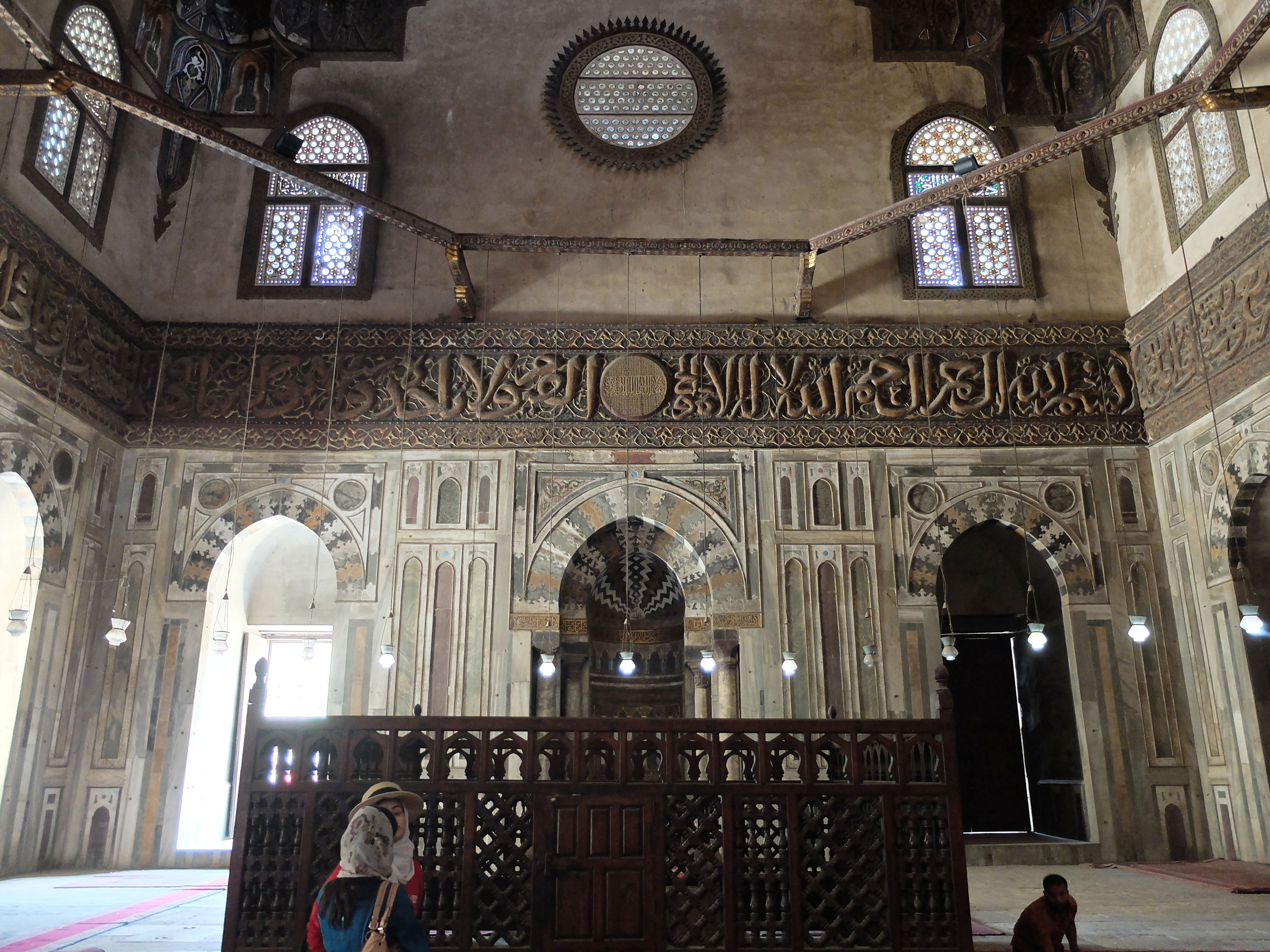
The mausoleum chamber

The position of the mausoleum relative to the rest of the building was unusual in that it was located directly behind the qibla wall of the mosque, meaning it stood in the direction towards which Muslims in the mosque would pray. This is something not found in any other Mamluk religious building, though there is apparently no evidence that this was seen as controversial at the time. This layout had the consequence of making the mausoleum project outwards into Rumayla square and towards the Citadel, probably to make it more prominent when seen from the Citadel. The mausoleum chamber is accessed from inside the mosque, through a doorway to the left of the mihrab in the qibla wall. On the same wall, on the right side, there is a large, door-sized window which also opens to the mausoleum chamber. This window is distinguished by a set of doors which are notable for their exceptionally fine craftsmanship, made from copper-niello, inlaid with gold and silver, and featuring geometric star patterns and Thuluth-style Arabic inscriptions.

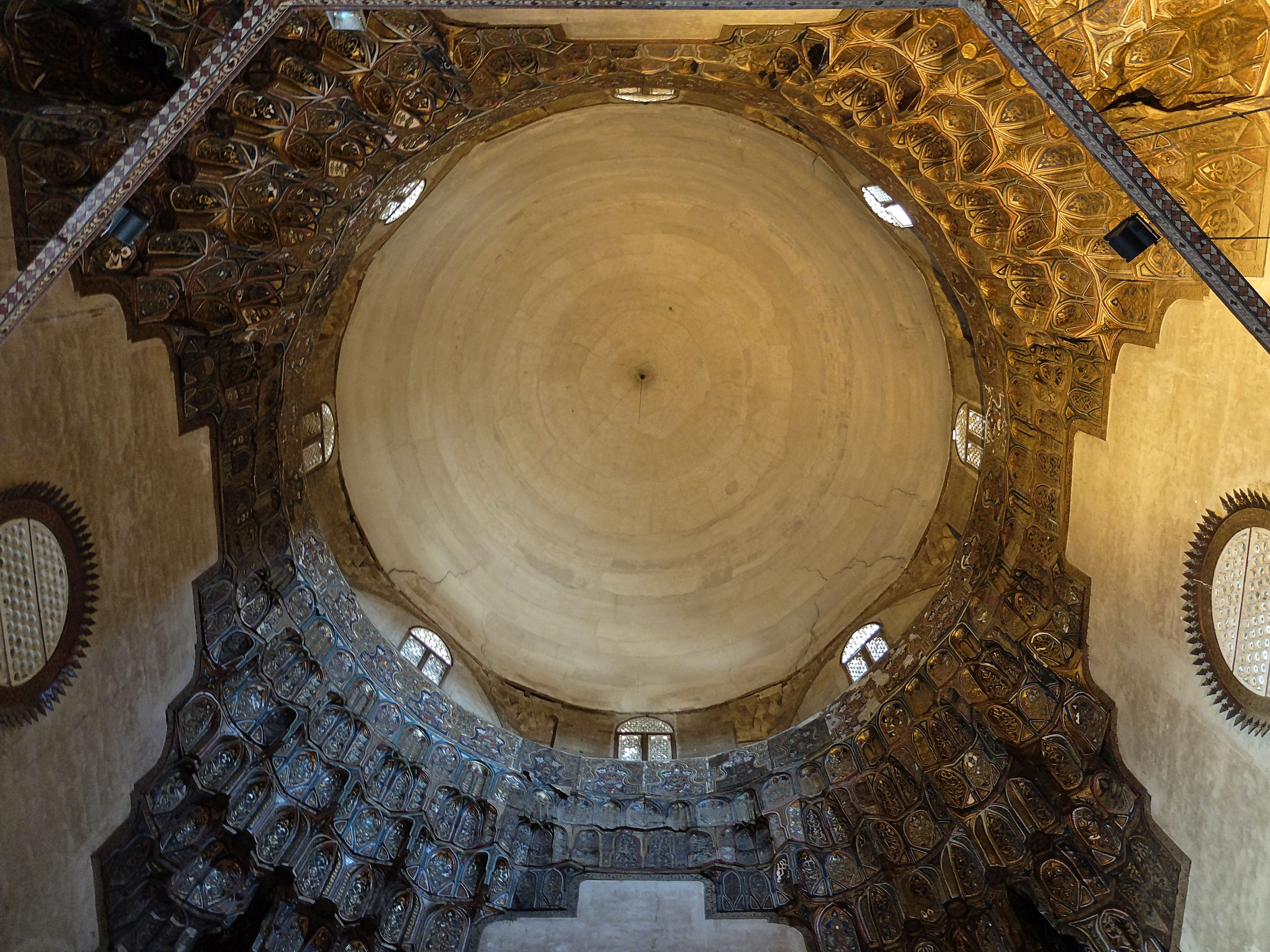
Interior of the dome over the mausoleum

Inside, the chamber is even more lavishly decorated, with multicolored marble mosaic paneling on the lower walls and a large painted inscription of the Throne Verse, carved in wood, running around the entire chamber above this. The marble mihrab is similar to the one in the main qibla iwan of mosque. The square chamber transitions gradually to the round dome (12 meters in diameter) with the use of wooden pendentives, typical of Mamluk architecture, which are sculpted into muqarnas forms and richly painted and gilded.

The dome of the mausoleum chamber, visible from outside and from the Citadel, is no longer original but was replaced with the current one in 1671. This might have been due to damage from the fallen minaret in 1659 or from cannonballs fired from the Citadel in times of conflict. The original dome was also made of wood, despite the heavy buttressed walls of the chamber being able to support something heavier. However, the original dome had a very different shape. An Italian traveler in the early 17th century described it as being shaped like an egg; more specifically, it started narrow at the bottom then swelled out like a bulb, before finishing in a pointed tip.

The cenotaph at the middle of the mausoleum chamber, placed behind a wooden screen, is dated to 1384. Sultan Hasan's body was never found after he was killed and as such he was never buried here. Instead, the tomb is occupied by his two young sons. The mausoleum is also furnished with a large wooden lectern decorated with geometric star patterns and inlaid with ivory, which was meant to hold one of the giant royal copies of the Qur'an owned by the foundation.

=== Other structures of the foundation ===
The northwestern side of the mosque-madrasa is currently occupied by ruins and excavated remains. A primary school (maktab) once stood on this side, as well as a set of latrines and ablutions fountains. A row of arched rooms or units is also visible, and may have been used for shops as part of a weapons market. There was also a rectangular pool and a waterwheel, probably part of a pre-existing water aqueduct system which brought water to the royal stables of the Citadel.

== See also ==
- Islam in Egypt
- List of madrasas in Egypt
- List of mosques in Cairo
- Late medieval domes
- Al-Khalifa District

== Bibliography ==
- Al-Harithy, Howyda N. (1996). "The Complex of Sultan Hasan in Cairo: Reading Between the Lines". In Gibb, H.A.R.; E. van Donzel; P.J. Bearman; J. van Lent (eds.). The Encyclopaedia of Islam. BRILL. ISBN 9789004106338. (p. 68 ff)
- Herz, Maz (1899). La mosquée du sultan Hassan au Caire. Cairo: Le Caire.
