= Gök Medrese, Sivas =

Madrasa in Sivas, Turkey

Gökmedrese Sahibiye Medresesi
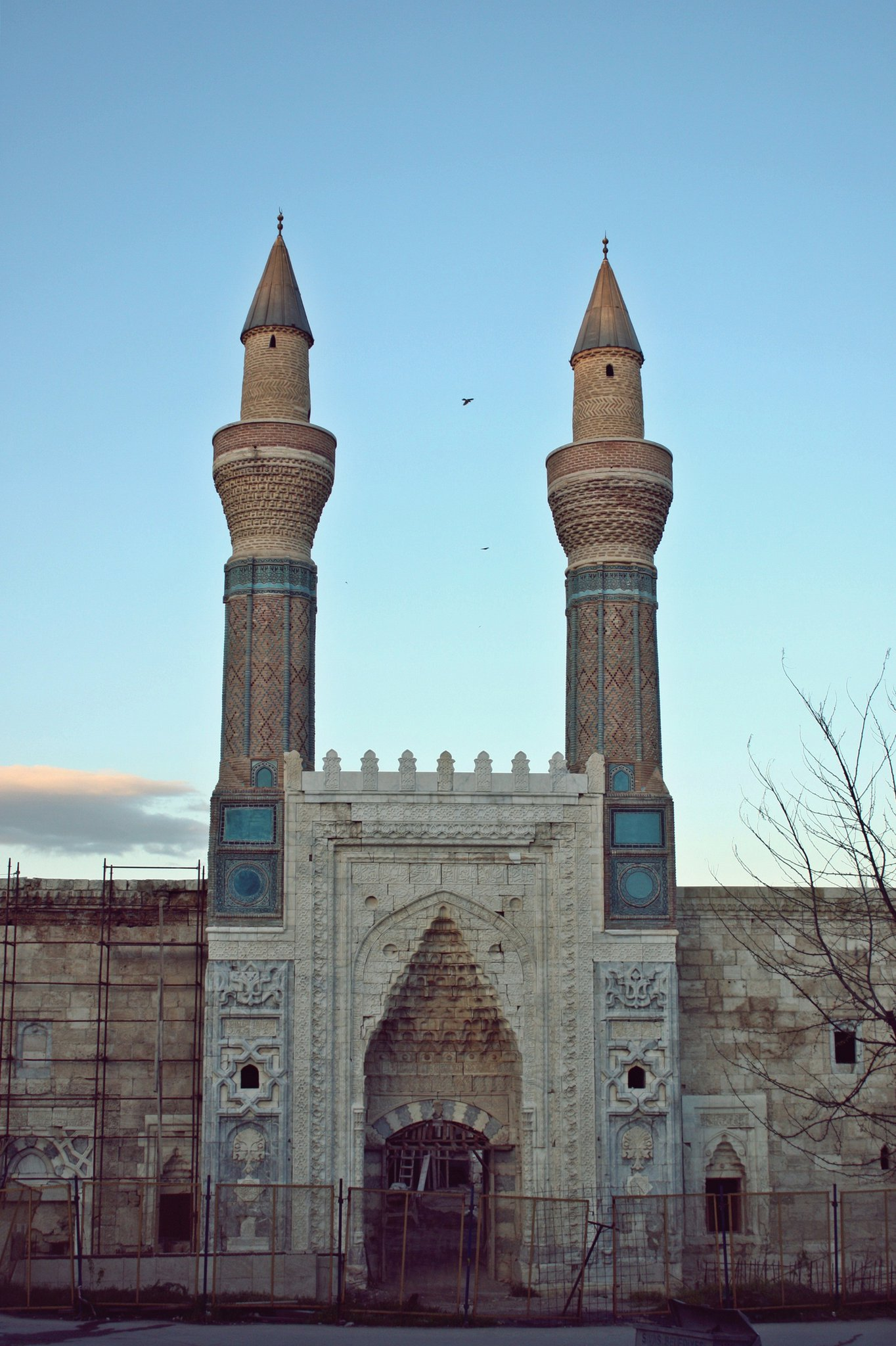

Religion
- Affiliation: Islam

Location
- Location: Sivas, Turkey
- Interactive map of Gökmedrese; Sahibiye Medresesi
- Coordinates: 39.74424°N 37.01666°E

Architecture
- Architect: Kaloyan
- Type: Madrasah
- Style: Seljuk
- Completed: 1271

Specifications
- Direction of façade: west-southwest
- Width: 31.25 m (102.5 ft)
- Minaret: 2
- Minaret height: 25 m (82 ft)

Website
- www.gokmedrese.com

Gökmedrese or Gök Medrese (literally: "Blue Madrasah"), also known as Sahibiye Medresesi, is a 13th-century medrese, an Islamic educational institution, in the city of Sivas, Turkey.

== History ==
The medrese was commissioned by Sahip Ata Fahrettin Ali, a vizier and the de facto ruler of Seljuk Sultanate of Rûm after the death of Pervane in 1277. Up to 1271, he was usually in good terms with Pervane. He commissioned many buildings in Anatolia. Gökmedrese is one of the most imposing of all. The original name of the medrese is Sahibiye, referring to Sahip Ata. But it is usually known as Gökmedrese, because of the sky-blue tiles used at the building.

The medrese was constructed by an architect known as "Kaloyan" (Byzantine Greek: Καλό Γιάννη, "Kalo Yianni," literally 'good John') from Konya. Originally, it was a two-story building. There were also a hamam (bathhouse) and a soup kitchen for 30 people. But presently, only the 13 rooms of the lower floor exist. It was restored in 1823 and was in use up until 1926.

== Technical details ==
There are two 25 m (82 ft) high minarets, one at each side of the portal. The width of the building is 31.25 m (102.5 ft). The dimensions of the courtyard is 24.25 m × 14.40 m (79.6 ft × 47.2 ft). There are two divisions, one leading to the mescit (prayer room) and the other to class rooms.

== Vakıf ==
In middle age Islamic countries Vakıf was a source of revenue, endowed for the exploitation and the maintenance of the foundations as well as for the salaries of the staff. In Gökmedrese case, there were 85 markets, nine villages, two farms and some other sources endowed as vakfiye.

== Gallery ==
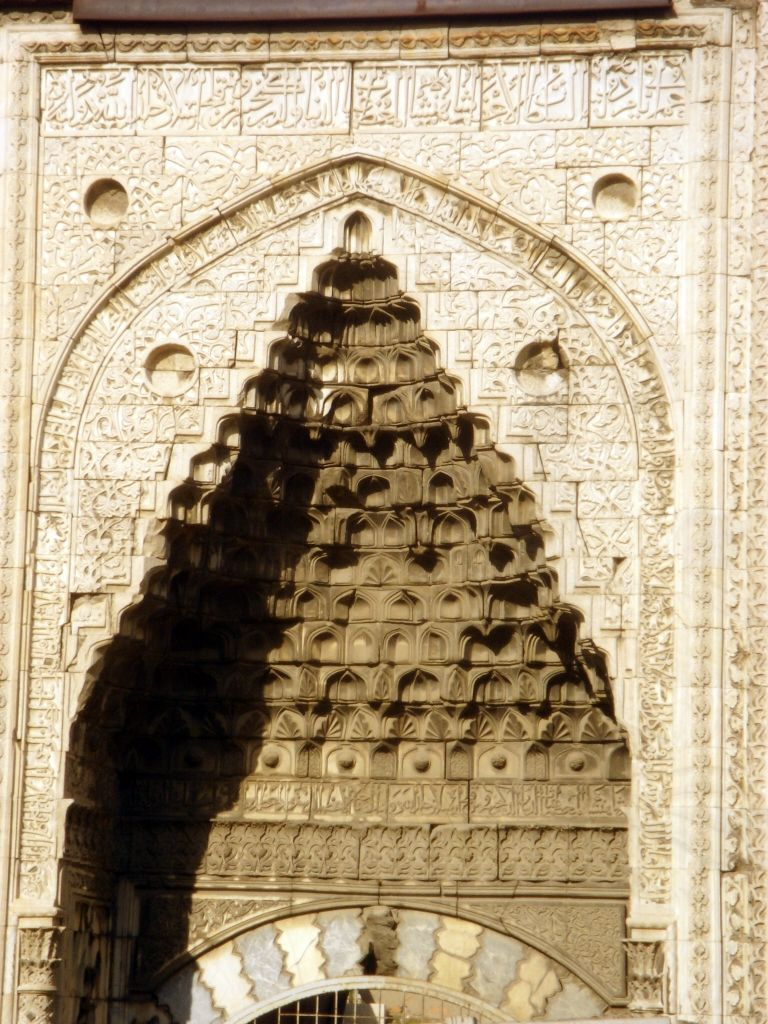
Muqarnas on the portal.

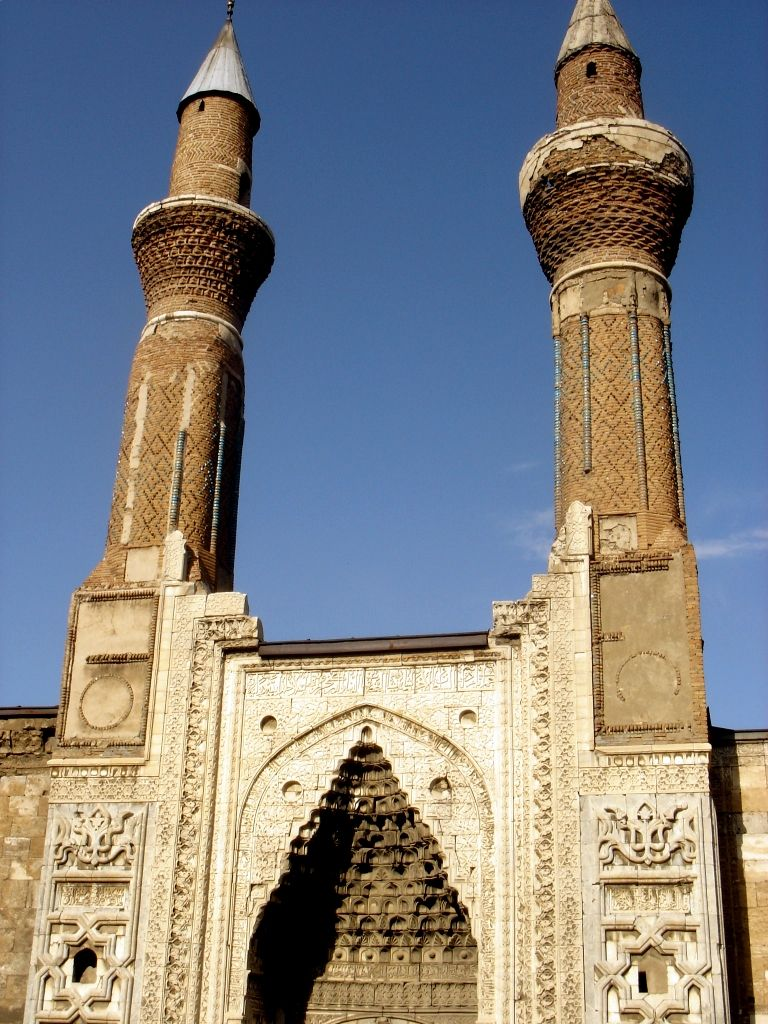

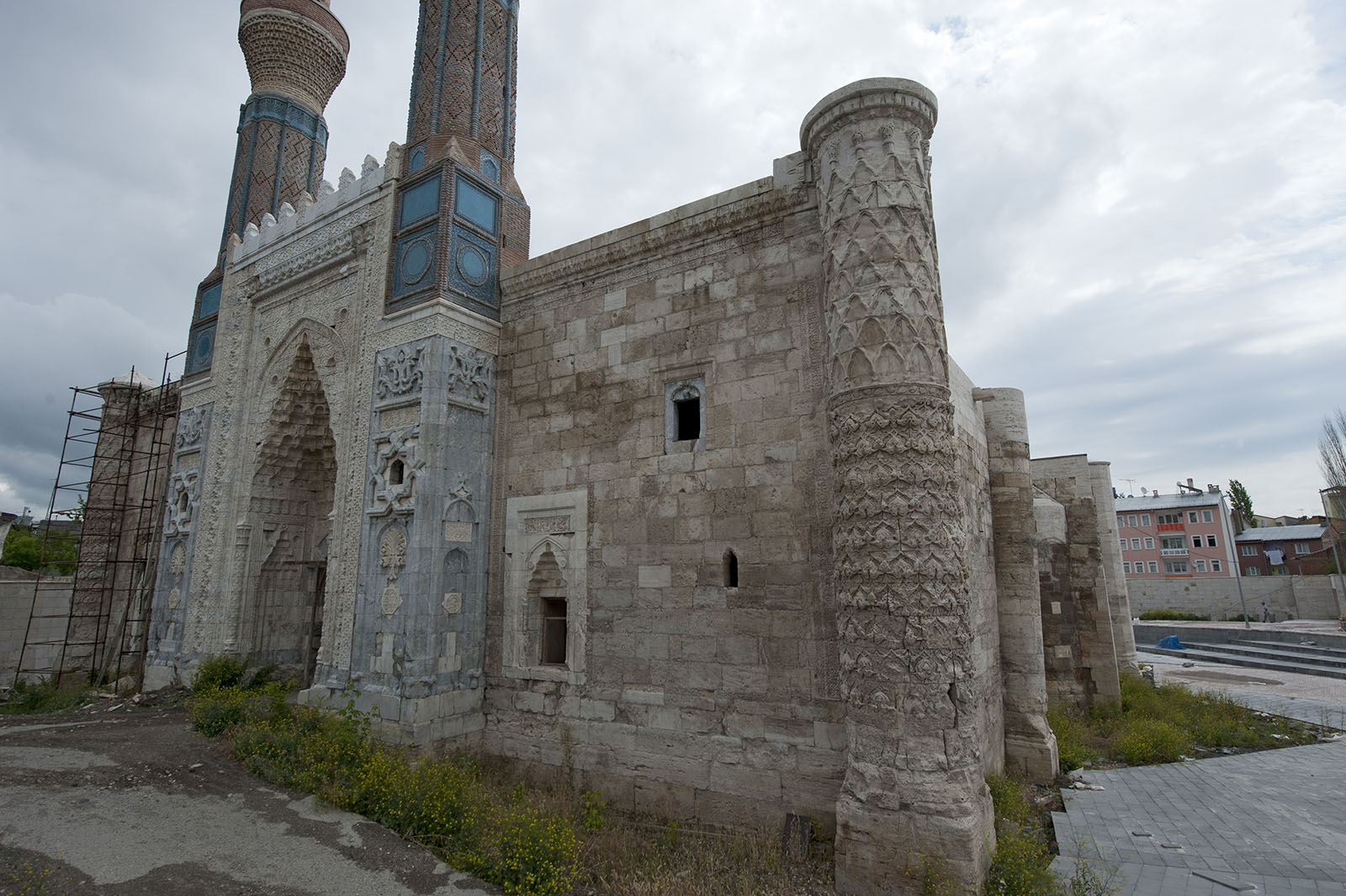
Gök Medrese during restoration shot from right side

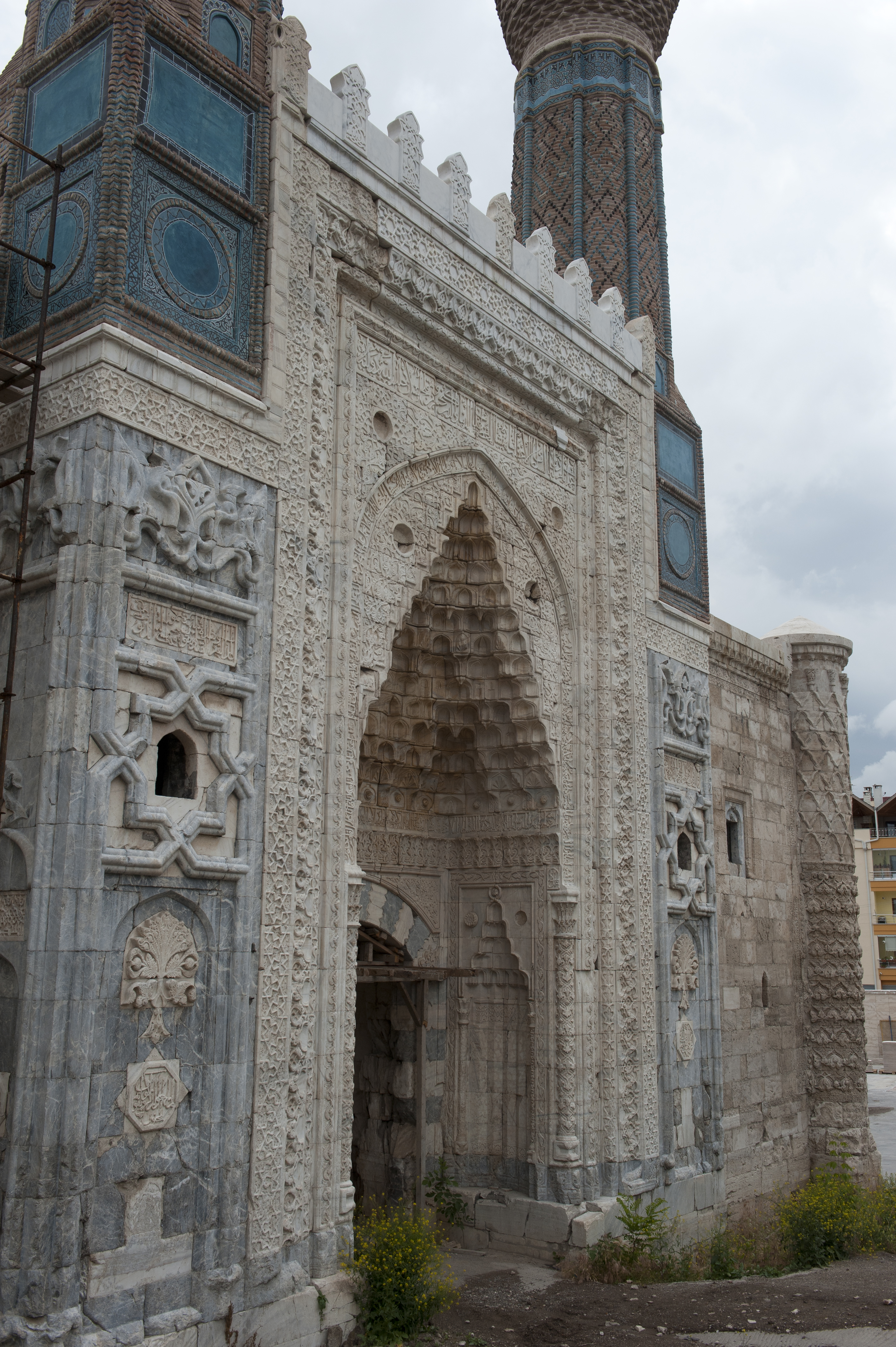
Gök Medrese before restoration Portal from left side

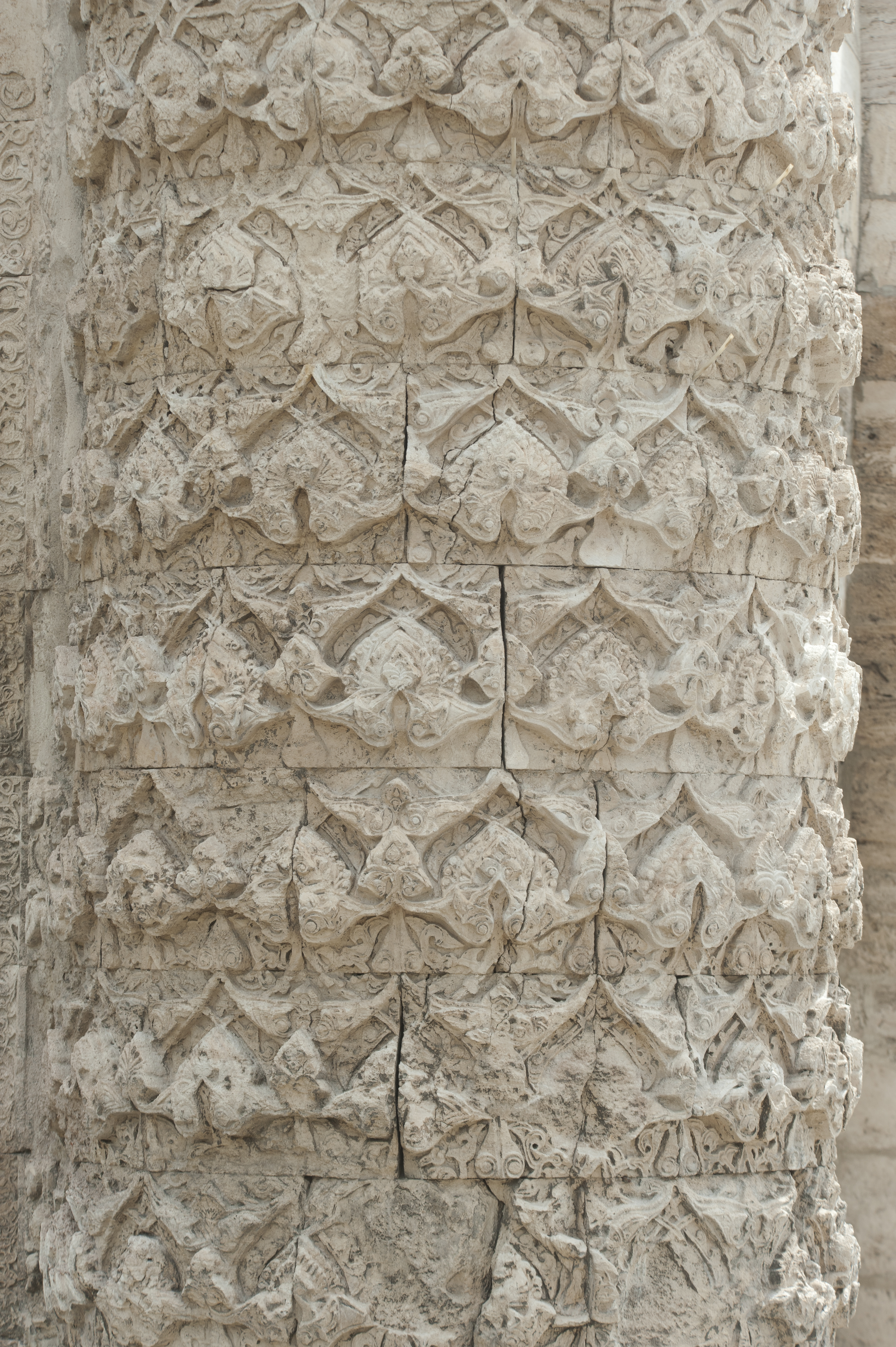
Gök Medrese before restoration Decoration corner

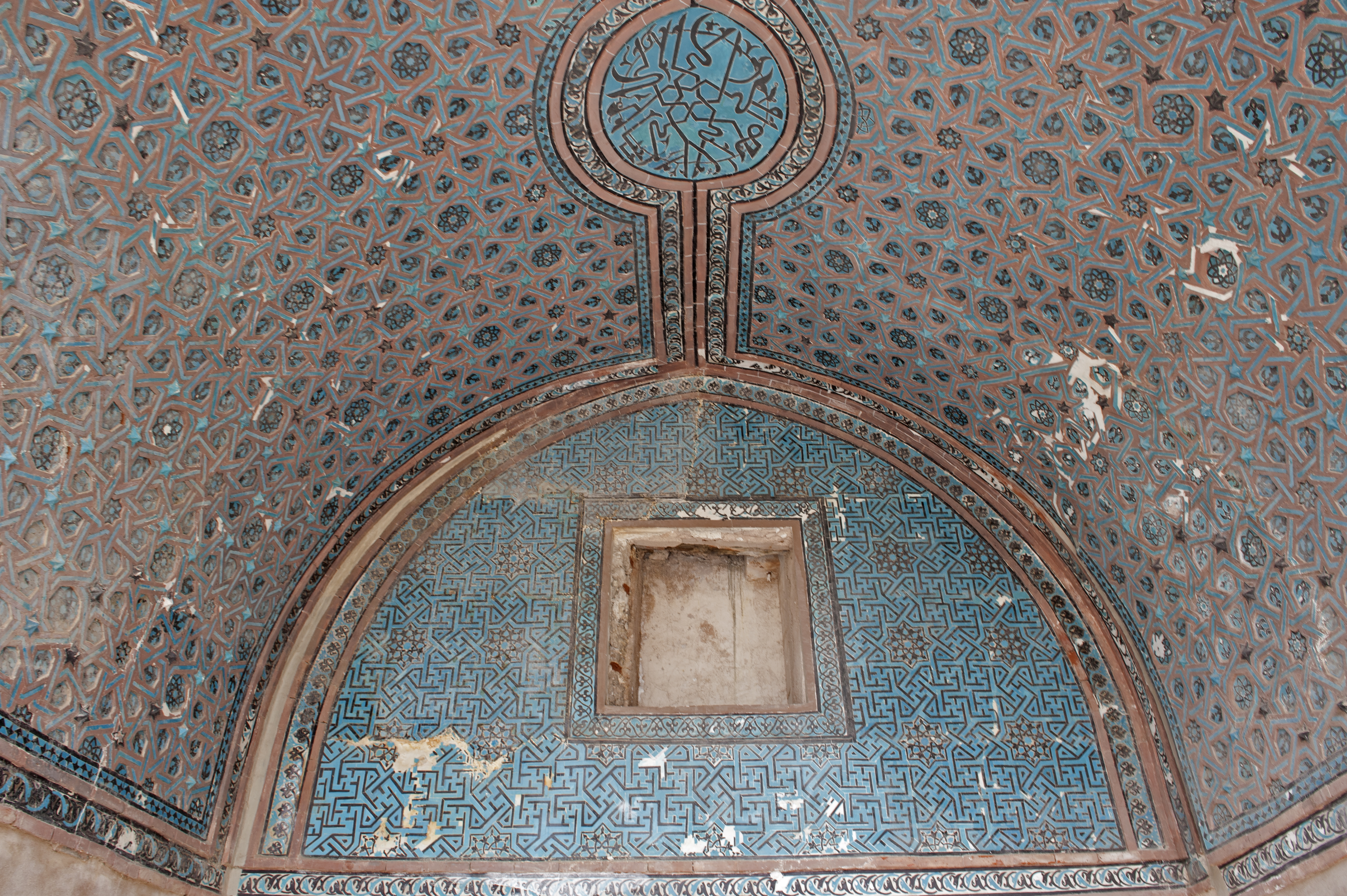
Gök Medrese before restoration Ceiling inside

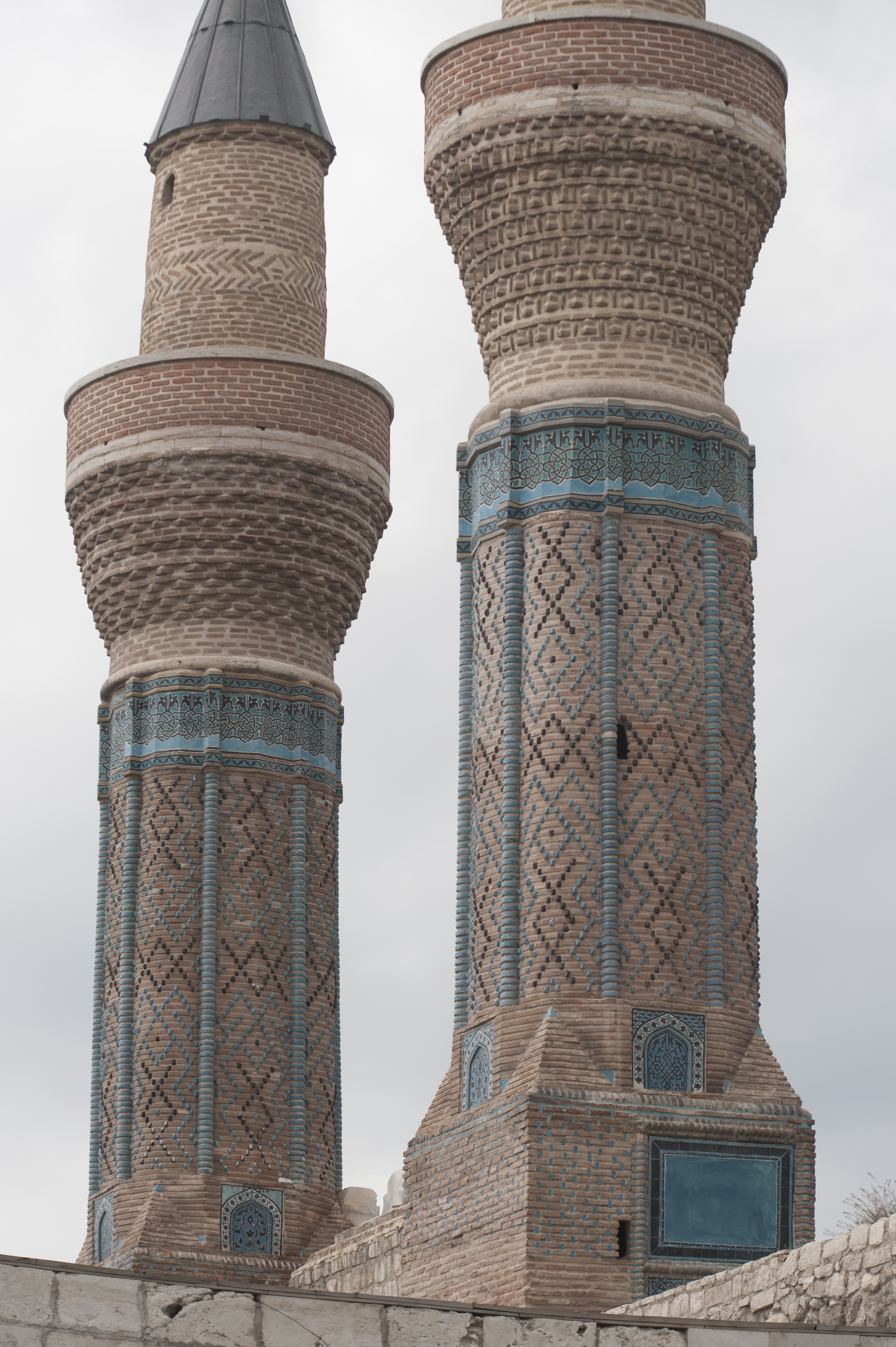
Gök Medrese during restoration Minarets

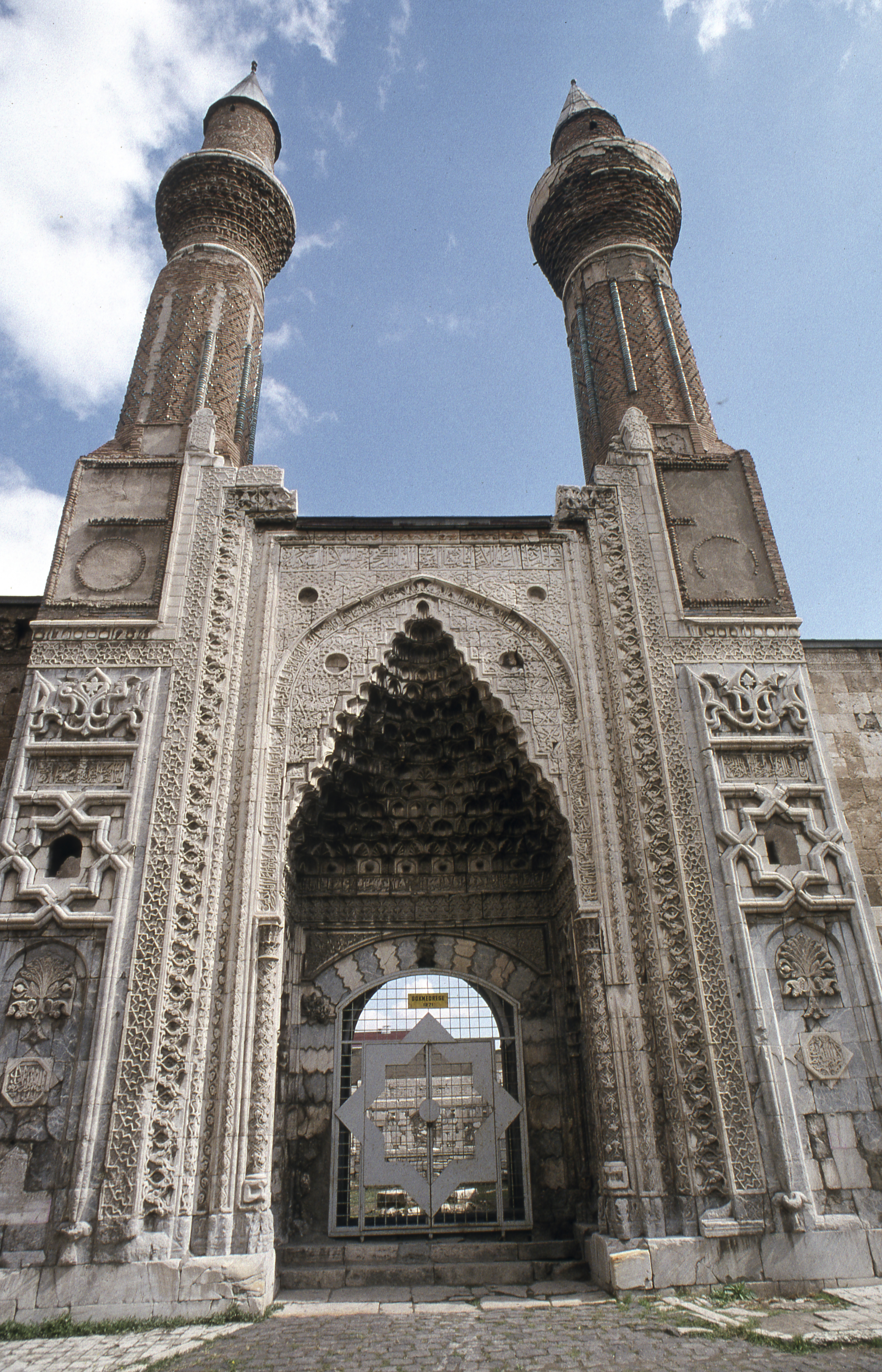
Gök Medrese before restoration Portal

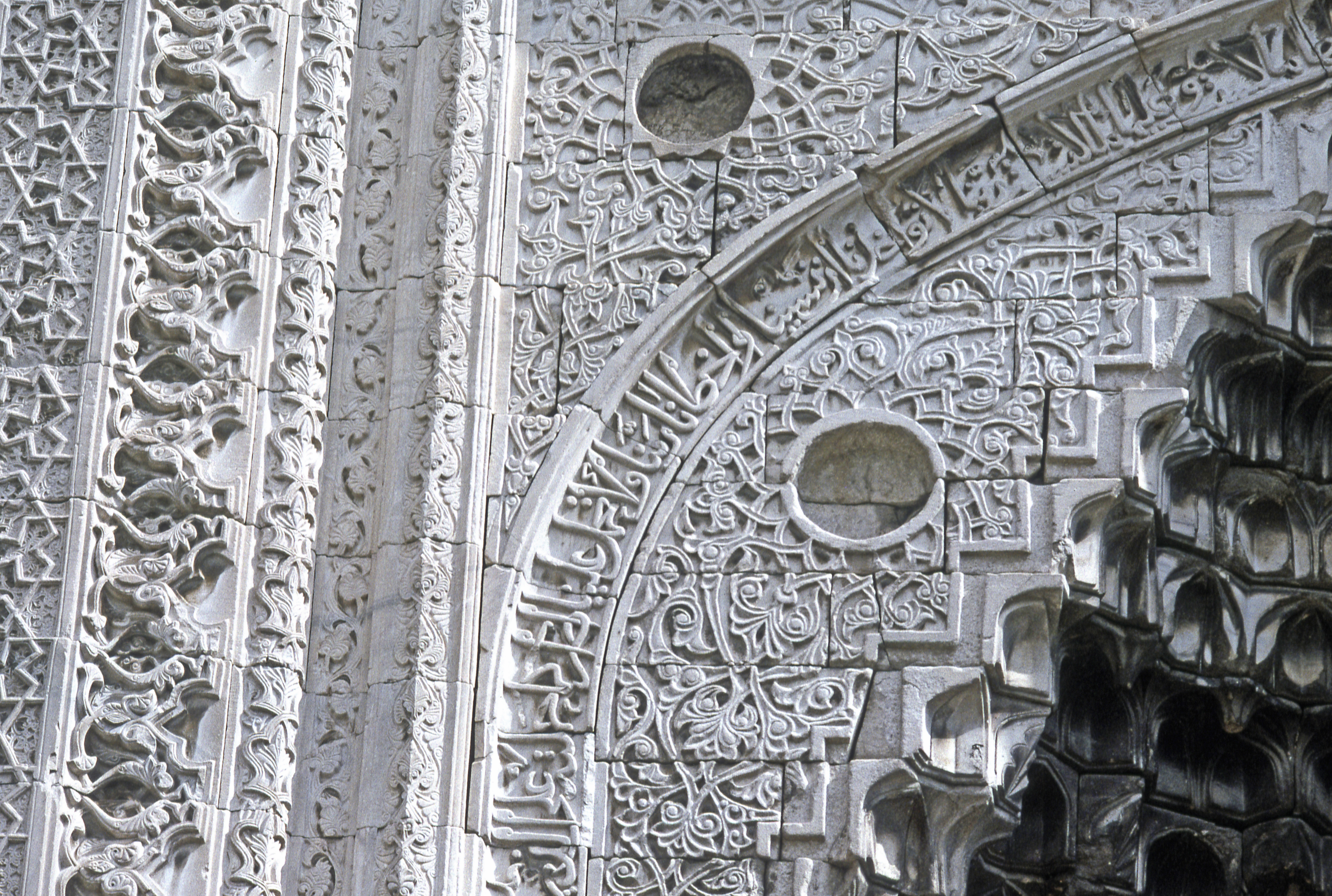
Gök Medrese before restoration Portal detail

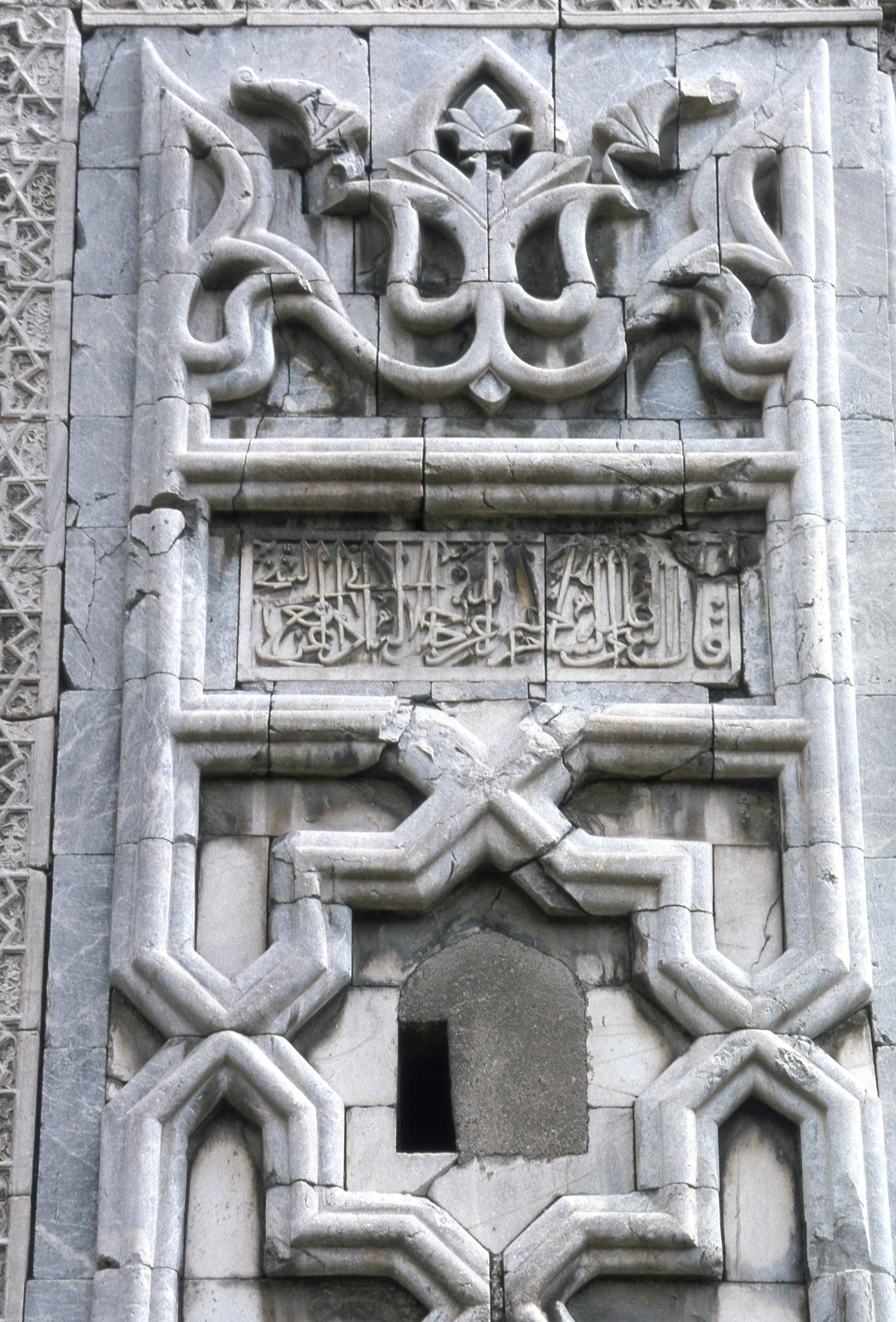
Gök Medrese before restoration Portal detail

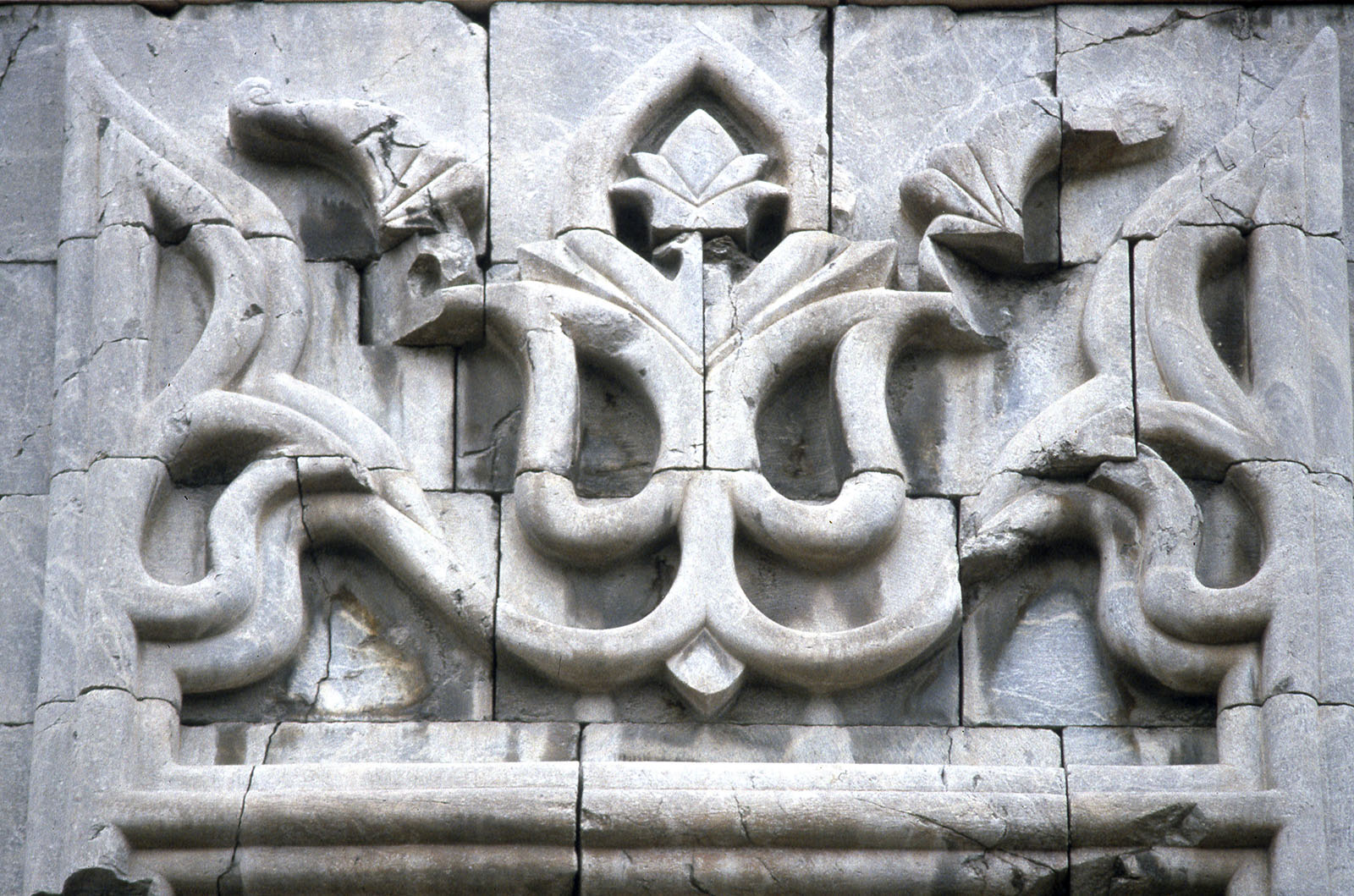
Gök Medrese before restoration Portal detail closer up

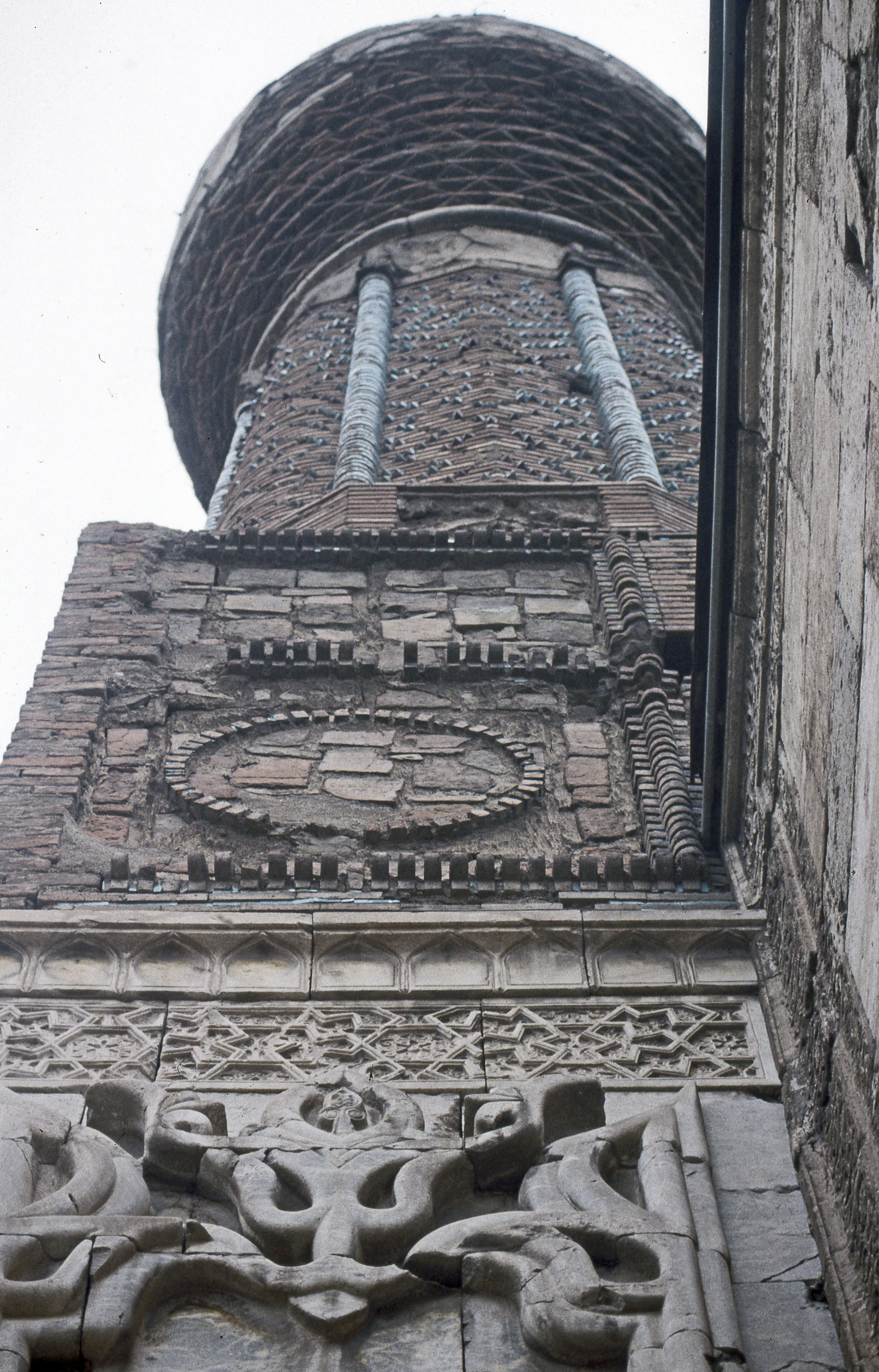
Gök Medrese before restoration Portal side

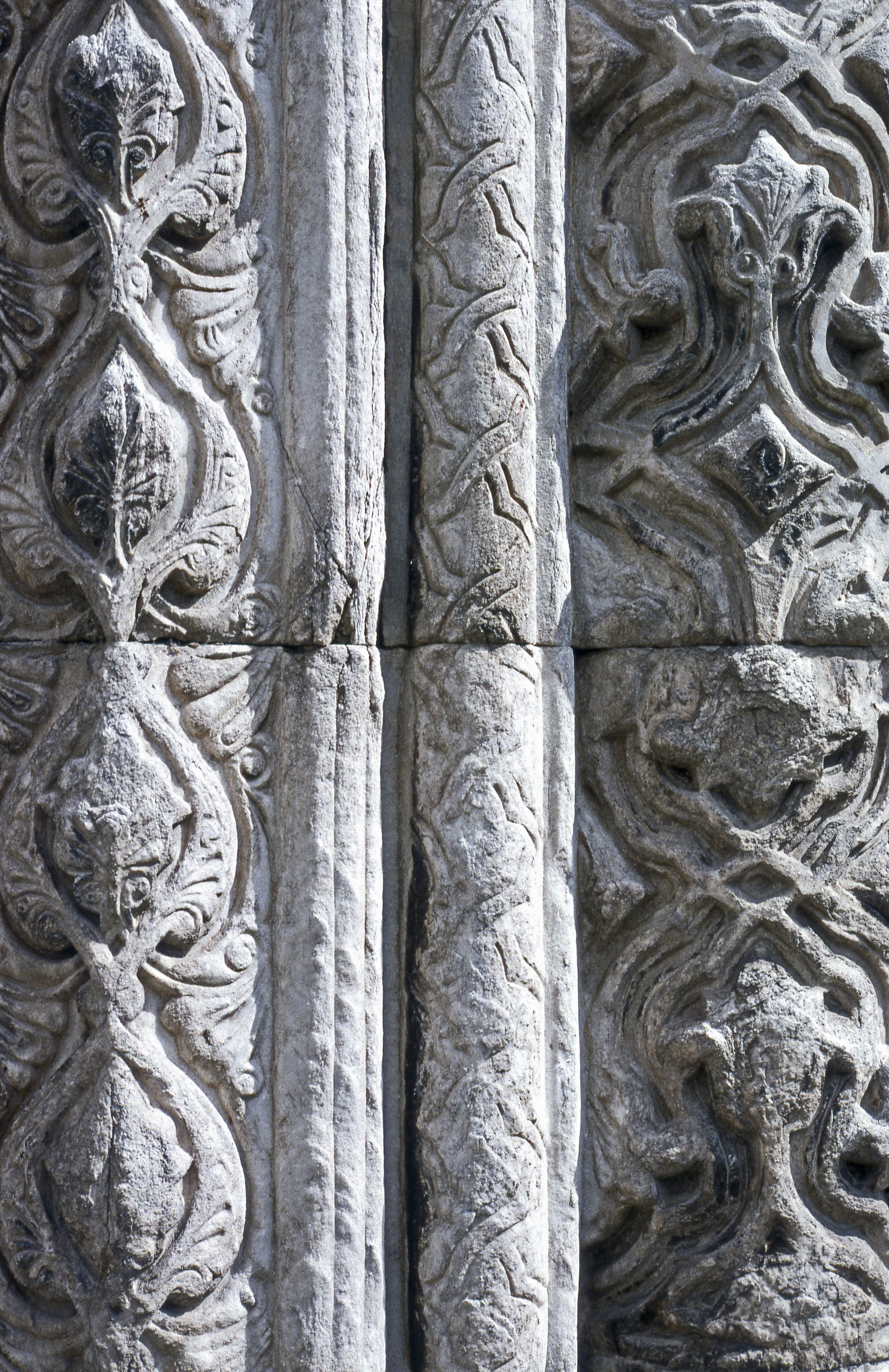
Gök Medrese before restoration Decoration

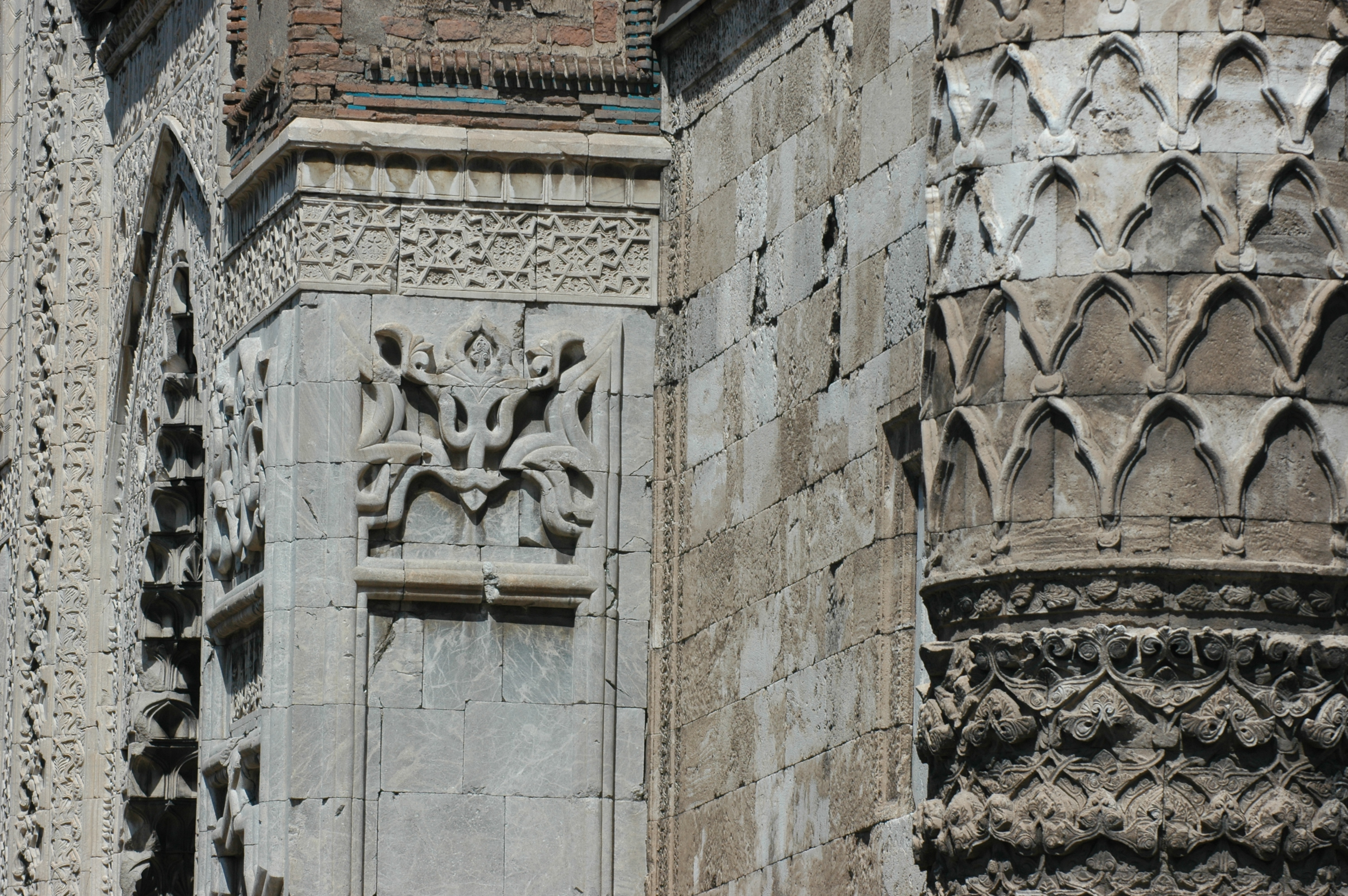
Gök Medrese before restoration shot from side

== Notes ==
a: possibly of Armenian or Cappadocian Greek origin
