= Kaluyan =

13th-century architect

Kaluyan al-Qunawi was an architect who designed many structures in medieval central Anatolia. He is accepted to have been originally Christian and has later converted to Islam. Some scholars identified him with Kaluk ibn Abdullah, another famous architect of the era. Also a convert, Kaluk ibn Abdullah is held to have been a different person and possibly tutored Kaluyan al-Qunawi. Kaluyan is thought to have been of Greek origin. He was one of the Christian disciples of the famous Sufi scholar and poet Rumi.

== Bibliography ==
- Karpuz, Haşim (2001). "Kālûyân". TDV Encyclopedia of Islam, Vol. 24 (Kāânî-i Şîrâzî – Kastamonu) (in Turkish). Istanbul: Turkiye Diyanet Foundation, Centre for Islamic Studies. p. 269. ISBN 978-975-389-451-7.
