= Egyptian pound =

Currency of Egypt

جنيه مصرى (Egyptian Arabic)
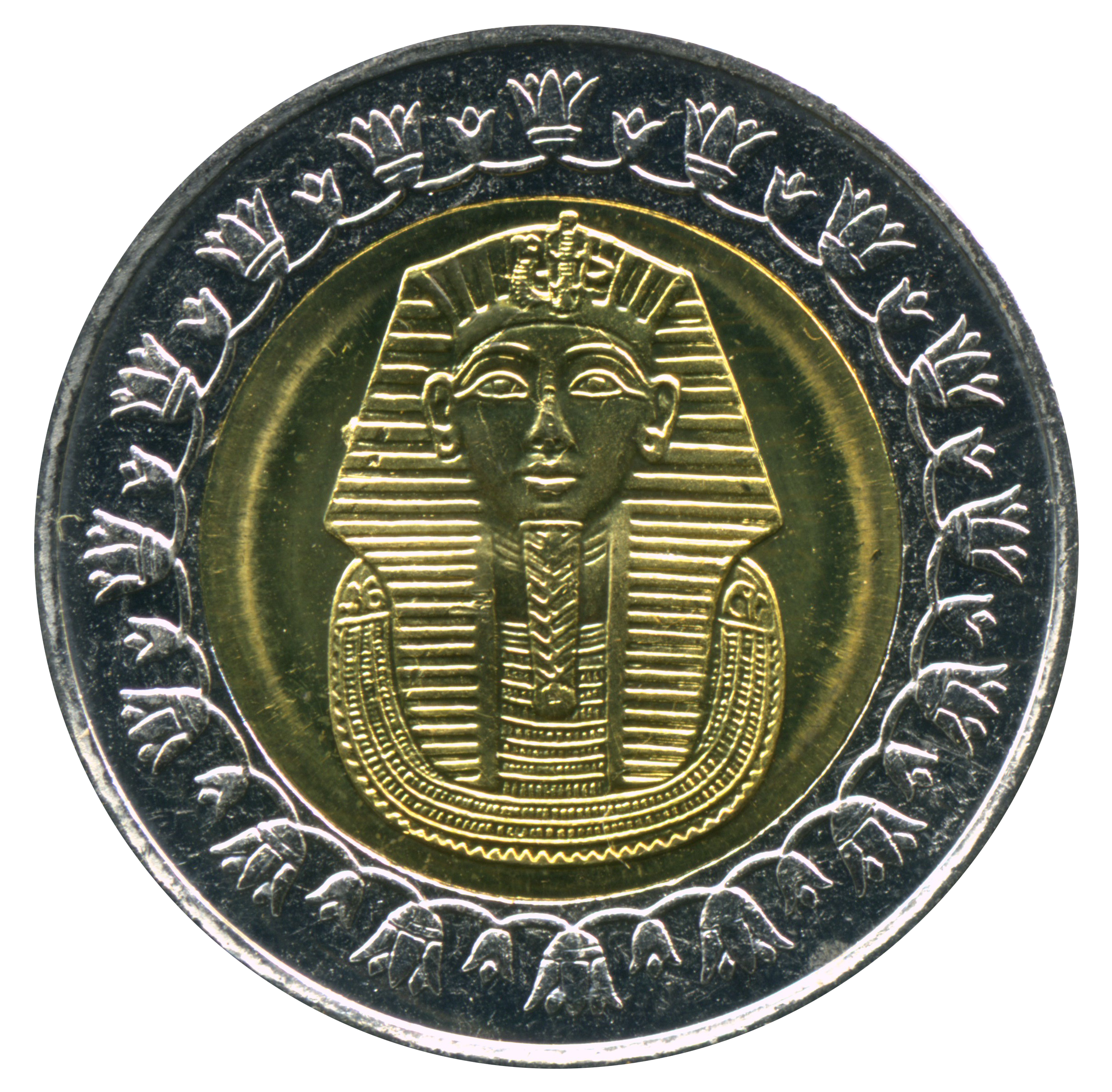
Obverse of a modern E£1 coin
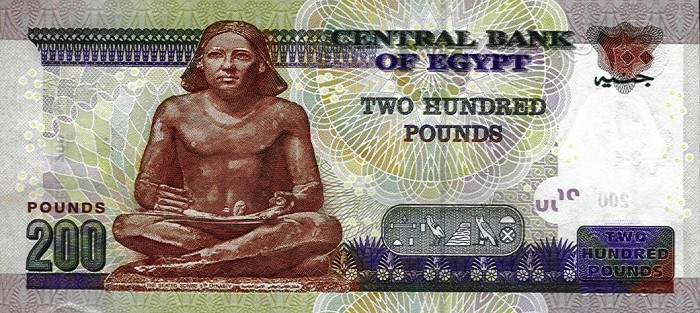
Reverse of the E£200 banknote

ISO 4217
- Code: EGP (numeric: 818)
- Subunit: 0.01

Units of account
- Base unit: pound (Arabic: junayh, جُنَيْه)
- Plural: pounds (junayhāt)
- Symbol: £ (Arabic: .ج.م)
- Subunit
- 1/100: piastre (qirş, قرش)
- 1/1,000: millieme (historical; mallīm)
- Plural
- piastre: piastres (qurūš)
- Symbol
- piastre: PT

Denominations
- Banknotes
- Freq. used: £1, £5, £10, £20, £50, £100, £200
- Rarely used: 25 PT, 50 PT
- Coins: 25 PT, 50 PT, £1

Demographics
- Date of introduction: 1834; 192 years ago
- Replaced: Egyptian piastre
- Official user(s): Egypt
- Unofficial user: Gaza Strip

Issuance
- Central bank: Central Bank of Egypt
- Website: www.cbe.org.eg/en/

Valuation
- Inflation: 12.11% (2025)

The Egyptian pound (Egyptian Arabic: جنيه مصرى [ɡeˈneː ˈmɑsˤri, ˈɡeni-] from English "guinea"; symbol: £; international abbreviations: E£, £E, LE; currency code: EGP; Arabic symbol: ج.م.) is the official currency of Egypt, introduced in 1834 to replace the Egyptian piastre.

Each pound (Arabic: junayh, جُنَيْه) is divided into 100 piastres (Arabic: qirsh, قرش; abbreviation: "PT", short for "piastre tarif").

Each pound was also historically divided into 1,000 milliemes (مليم [mælˈliːm]; French: millième, abbreviated to m or mill). Since July 6, 2022, the 10- and 20-pound notes have been made out of polymer plastic paper.

== History ==
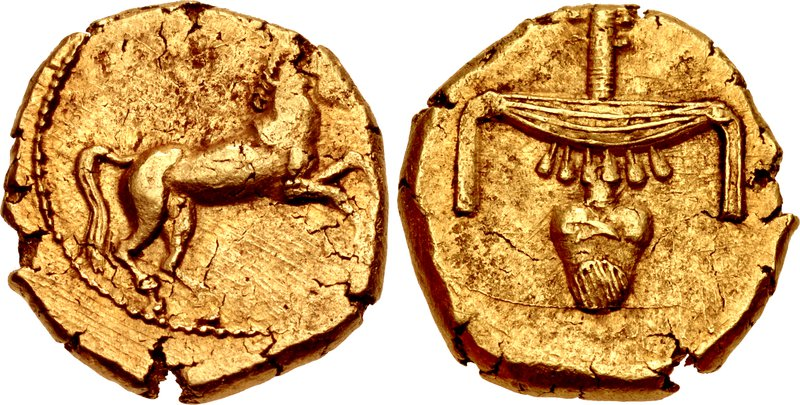
Egyptian gold stater of Nectanebo II: reverse with hieroglyphs nfr-nb, minted in Egypt, c. 360 BC

At the beginning of the 19th century, Egypt and Turkey shared a common currency, the Ottoman piastre, divided into 40 paras. However, under Muhammad Ali, Egypt started to issue its own coinage, and in 1834, by which time Egypt was now nominally independent from Ottoman rule, a decree was issued, adopting an exclusively Egyptian monetary system whereby Egypt went into a silver and gold bimetallic standard based on the Maria Theresa thaler rated at 20 piastres. The Maria Theresa thaler was a popular silver trade coin in the region around that time.

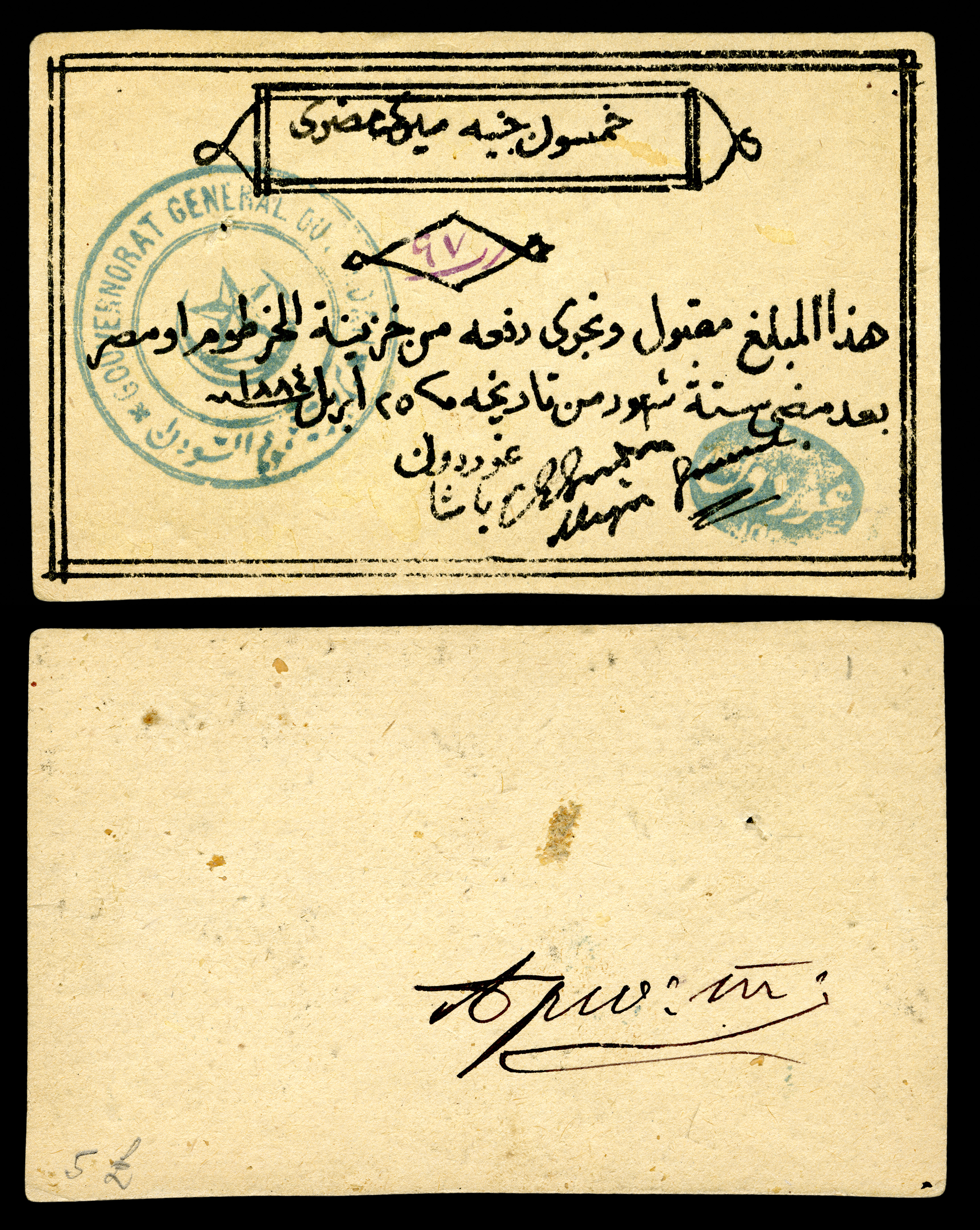
E£50 promissory note issued and hand-signed by Gen. Gordon during the Siege of Khartoum (26 April 1884)

In the wake of this currency reform, Egypt minted a gold coin known as the bedidlik, equal to 100 piastres, and a silver rial coin of 20 piastres corresponding to the Maria Theresa thaler. In 1839, a piastre contained 1.146 grams of silver, and meanwhile the British gold sovereign was rated at 97.5 piastres. While 100 Egyptian piastres and the bedidlik coin were referred to as a pound in the English-speaking world, this was not the principal unit in the new Egyptian monetary system of 1834. Reference to an Egyptian pound unit of account appeared in 1884 on a E£50 promissory note signed by General Gordon at the Siege of Khartoum, but it wasn't until the next year in 1885 that this unit of account would become the official unit.

Meanwhile, back in 1840, despite Egypt's separate coinage, it was agreed under the Turkish-Egyptian treaty dated that same year, that the Turkish and Egyptian coins should nevertheless maintain equal value. However, in 1844, the Ottoman piastre was devalued in conjunction with the creation of a new Ottoman lira unit, and Egypt did not follow suit. Hence the Egyptian and Turkish units split from each other in value, with the Egyptian unit continuing its exchange value of 97.5 piastres to the pound sterling.

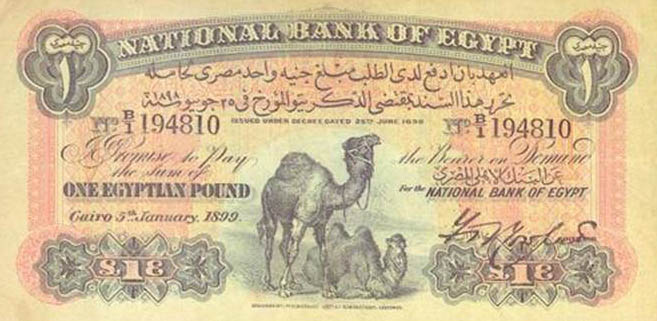
The first E£1 banknote issued in 1899

In 1885, Egypt went into a purely gold standard, and the Egyptian pound unit, known as the gineih, was introduced at E£1 = 7.4375 grams of fine gold. This unit was chosen on the basis of the gold content in the British gold sovereign and maintaining the exchange value of 97.5 piastres to the pound sterling, and it replaced the Egyptian piastre (qersh) as the chief unit of currency. This reform resulted in the Maria Theresa thaler being adjusted to 21 piastres, with 20 piastres now being rated at 5 French francs, and the foreign exchange rates were fixed by force of law for the important currencies which had become acceptable in the settlement of internal transactions. It wasn't however until 1899 that banknotes started to appear with the word "pounds" on them, written in English. Meanwhile, the piastre continued to circulate as 1/100 of a pound, the para was discontinued in 1909, and the piastre was divided into tenths (عشر القرش 'oshr el-qirsh). These tenths were renamed milliemes (malleem) in 1916.

The Egyptian pound was also used in Anglo-Egyptian Sudan between 1899 and 1956, and Cyrenaica when it was under British occupation and later an independent emirate between 1942 and 1951. It also circulated in Mandatory Palestine from 1918 to 1927, when the Palestine pound was introduced.

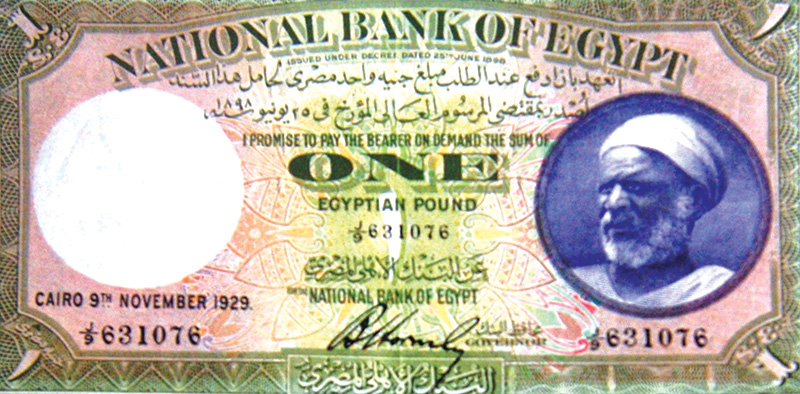
Obverse of the 1929 issue of E£1 banknote showing a photo of an Egyptian citizen

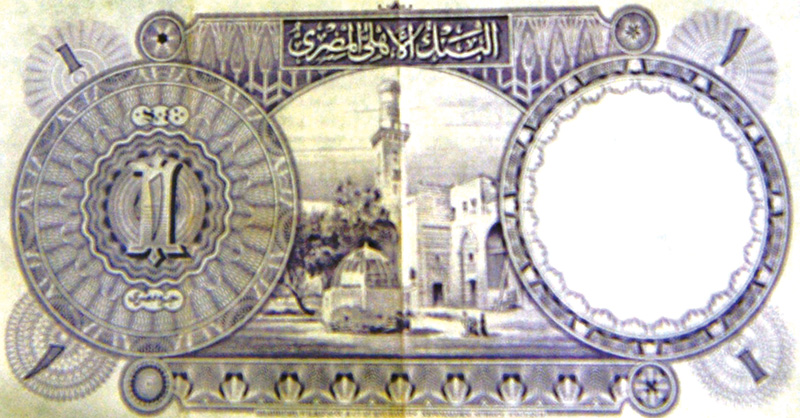
Reverse of the 1929 issue of E£1 banknote

Then, at the outbreak of World War I, with the gold specie standard being suspended in the UK, the Egyptian pound used a sterling peg of one pound and sixpence sterling (£1 0s 6d) to one Egyptian pound. Inverted, this gives E£0.975 for one pound sterling.

This exchange value of 97.5 piastres to the pound sterling continued until the early 1960s when Egypt devalued slightly and switched to a peg to the United States dollar, at a rate of E£1 = US$2.3.

Like many countries in the Middle East, Egypt has attempted to maintain a peg with the US dollar. Between 2018 and 2021 the peg was targeted at US$1 to E£16. In 2022 the Egyptian pound fell 40% against the dollar. In 2024 it fell substantially and by 2025 the rate was over E£40 to US$1.

== Nomenclature ==
=== Used for historical values or in vernacular speech ===
Several unofficial popular names are used to refer to different denominations of Egyptian currency. These include (from the word nickel) nekla (نكلة) [ˈneklæ] for 2 milliemes, ta'rifa (تعريفة) [tæʕˈriːfæ] for 5 milliemes, "nos franc" (نص فرانك) for 2 piastres, shelen (شلن) [ˈʃelen] (i.e. a shilling) for 5 piastres, bariza (بريزة) [bæˈriːzæ] for 10 piastres, and reyal (ريال) [reˈjæːl] ("real") for 20 piastres.

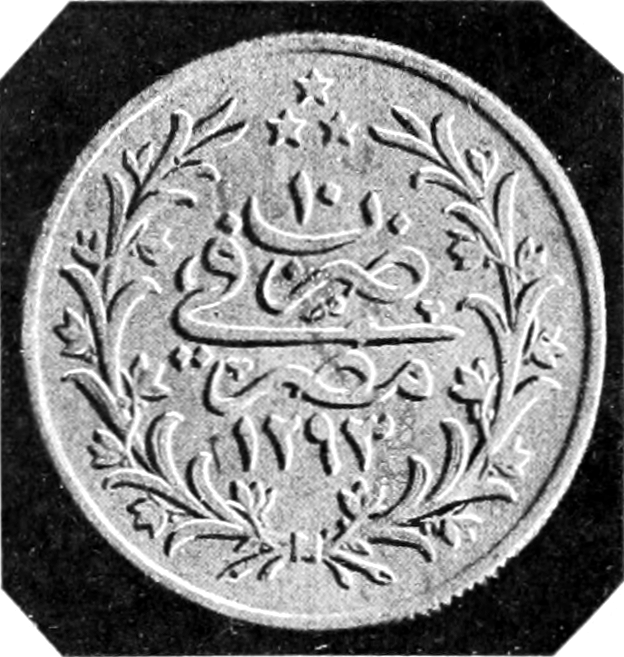
The 1914 issue of 5 milliemes, shelen

Since the piastre and millieme are no longer legal tender, the smallest denomination currently minted being the 25 PT coin (functioning as one-quarter of E£1), these terms have mostly fallen into disuse and survive as curios. A few have survived to refer to pound notes: bariza now refers to the E£10 note and reyal can be used in reference to the E£20 note.

=== Informal ===
Different sums of the Egyptian pound have nicknames in vernacular speech, for example: E£1 bolbol (بلبل) "nightingale" or gondi (جندى) "soldier"; E£1,000 bako (باكو) [ˈbæːko] "pack"; E£1,000,000 arnab (أرنب) [ˈʔærnæb] "rabbit"; E£1,000,000,000 feel (فيل) [fiːl] "elephant".

== Coins ==
Between 1837 and 1900, copper 1 and 5 para, silver 10 and 20 para, 1, 5, 10, and 20 piastre (pt), gold 5pt, 10pt. and 20pt and E£1 coins were introduced, with gold 50 PT coins issued in 1839.

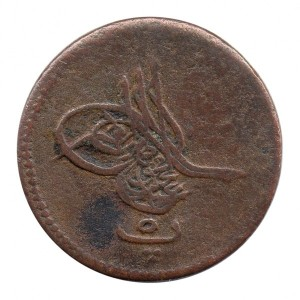
1839 issue of 5 Egyptian Para

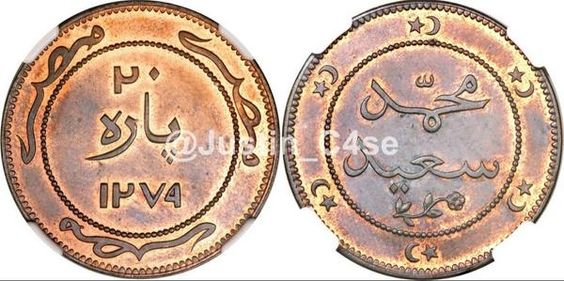
1855 issue of 20 Egyptian Para

Copper 10 para coins were introduced in 1853, although the silver coin continued to be issued. Copper 10 para coins were again introduced in 1862, followed by copper 4 para and 2 1/2 PT coins in 1863. Gold 25 PT coins were introduced in 1867.

In 1885, the para was replaced by the millieme in order to decimalise the currency and a new coinage was introduced. The issue consisted of bronze 1/4, 1/2, 1, 2 and 5 millieme (m), silver 1 PT, 2 PT, 5 PT, 10 PT and 20 PT coins. The gold coinage practically ceased, with only small numbers of 5 PT and 10 PT coins issued.

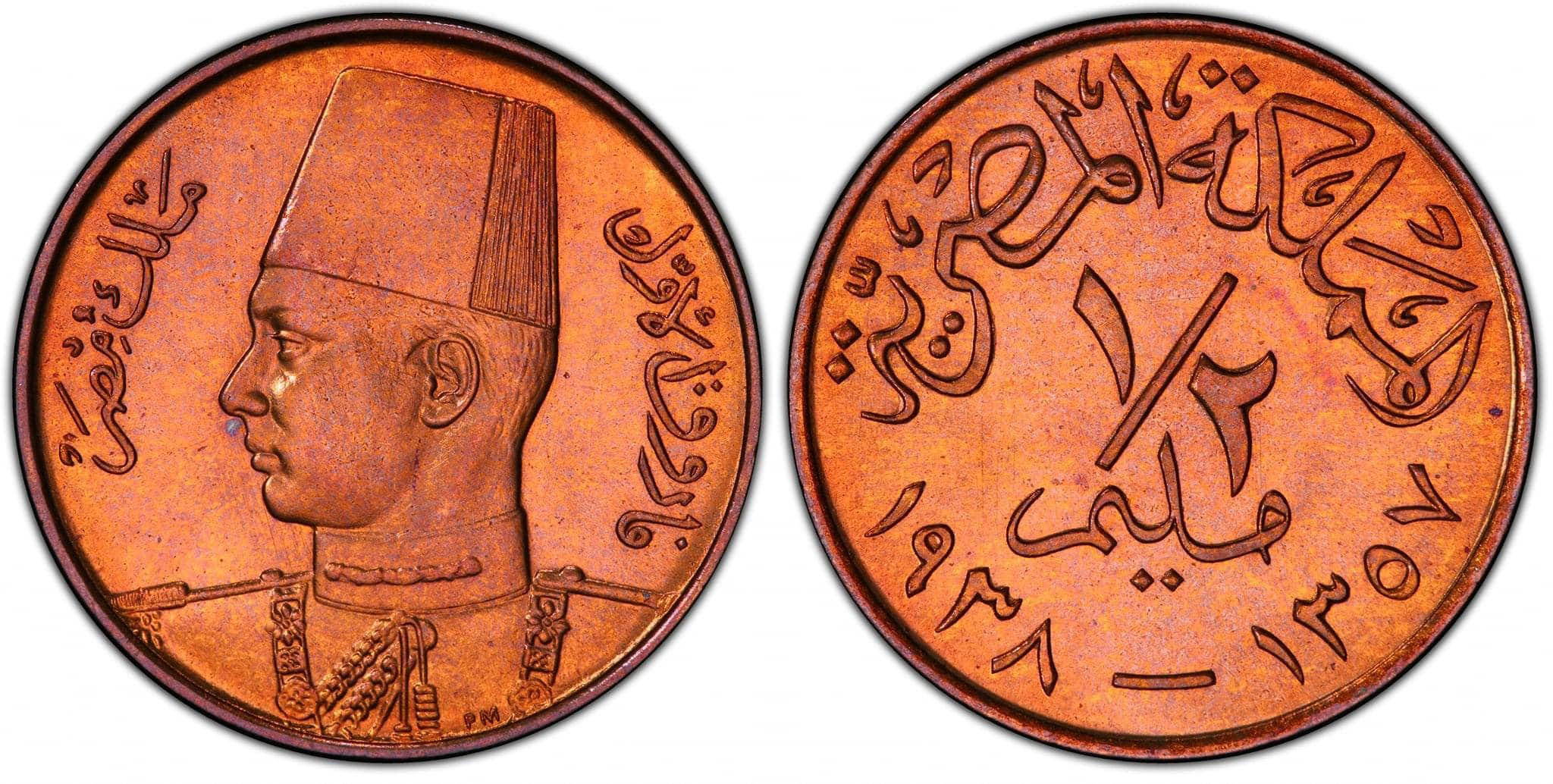
The 1938 issue of 1/2 Millieme

In 1916 and 1917, a new base metal coinage was introduced consisting of bronze 1/2m and holed, cupro-nickel 1m, 2m, 5m and 10m coins. Silver 2 PT, 5 PT, 10 PT and 20 PT coins continued to be issued, and a gold E£1 coin was reintroduced. Between 1922 and 1923, the gold coinage was extended to include 20 PT and 50 PT and E£1 and E£5 coins. In 1924, bronze replaced cupro-nickel in the 1m coin and the holes were removed from the other cupro-nickel coins. In 1938, bronze 5m and 10m coins were introduced, followed in 1944 by silver, hexagonal 2 PT coins.

Between 1954 and 1956, a new coinage was introduced, consisting of aluminium-bronze 1m, 5m and 10m and silver 5 PT, 10 PT and 20 PT coins, with the size of the silver coinage significantly reduced. An aluminium-bronze 2m coin was introduced in 1962. In 1967 the silver coinage was abandoned and cupro-nickel 5 and 10 piastre coins were introduced.

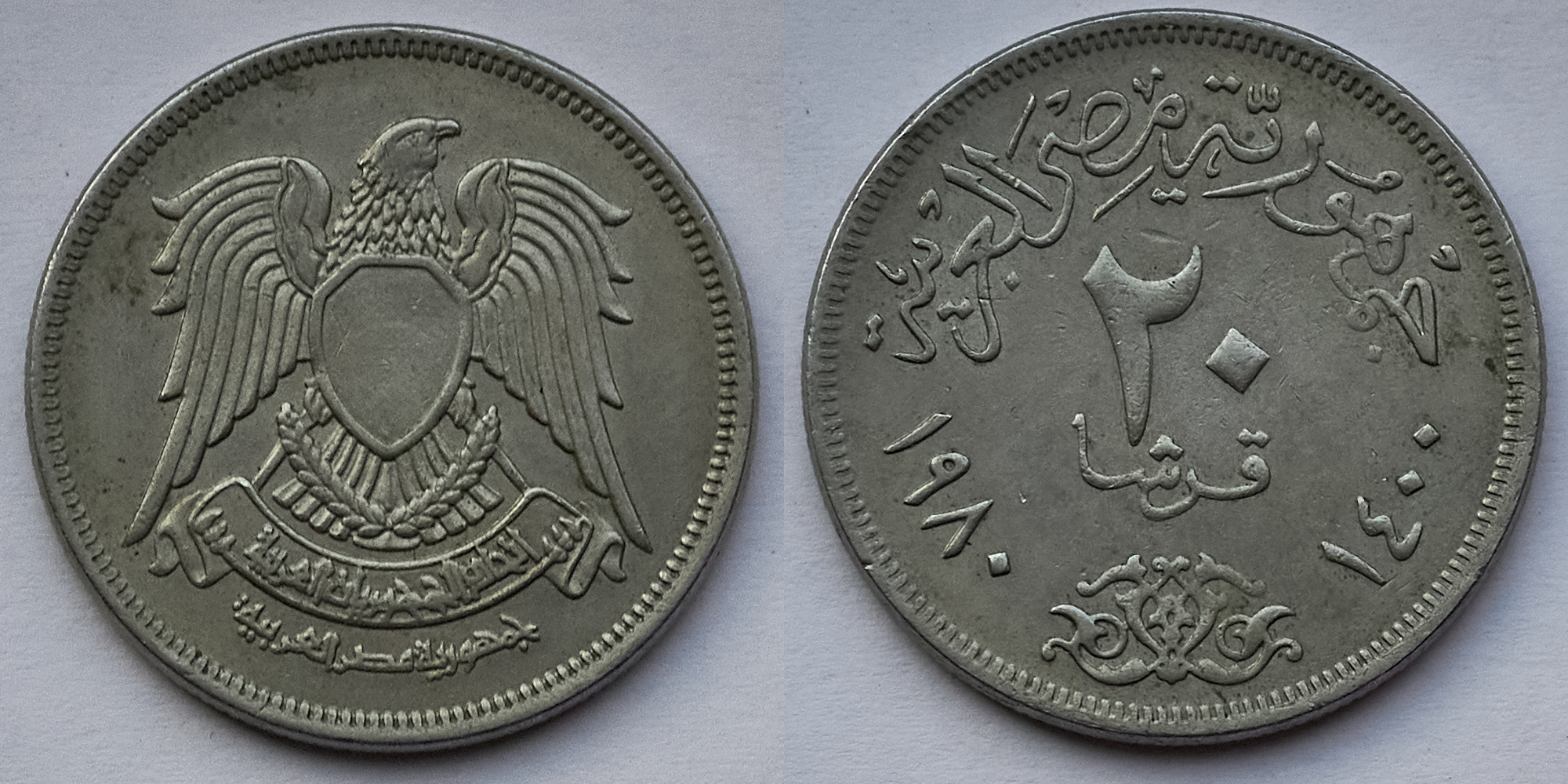
1980 issue of 20 Egyptian Piastres

Aluminium replaced aluminium-bronze in the 1m, 5m and 10m coins in 1972, followed by brass in the 5m and 10m coins in 1973. Aluminium-bronze 2 PT and cupro-nickel 20 PT coins were introduced in 1980, followed by aluminium-bronze 1 PT and 5 PT coins in 1984. In 1992, brass 5 and 10 piastre coins were introduced, followed by holed, cupro-nickel 25 piastre coins in 1993. The size of 5 PT coins was reduced in 2004, 10 PT and 25 PT coins - in 2008.

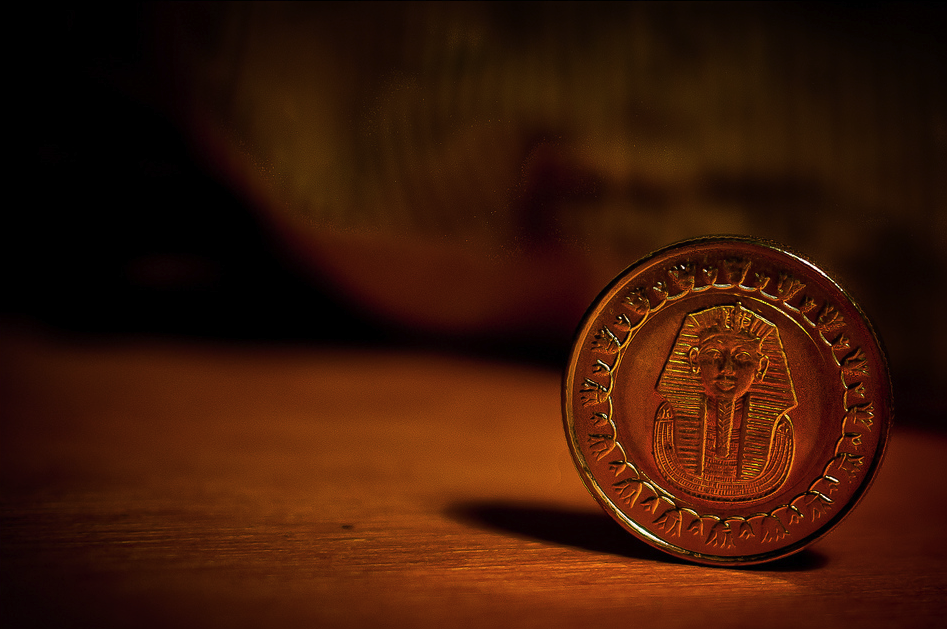
A contemporary E£1 coin in 2010.

On 1 June 2006, 50 PT and E£1 coins dated 2005 were introduced, and its equivalent banknotes were temporarily phased out from circulation in 2010. The coins bear the face of Cleopatra VII and Tutankhamun's mask, and the E£1 coin is bimetallic. The size and composition of 50 PT coins were reduced in 2007.

In April 2026. CBE announced that will introduce new 2 pound coin. and new revised 1 pound coin.

Coins in circulation
| Value | Debut | Image | | Specifications | | | | | Description | |
| Value | Debut | Obverse | Reverse | Diameter (mm) | Thickness (mm) | Mass (g) | Composition | | Obverse | Reverse |
|---|---|---|---|---|---|---|---|---|---|---|
| 5 PT** | 1984 | 5qershObverse1984 | 5qershReverse1984 | 23 | 1.2 | 4.9 | Copper 95%Aluminium 5% | | 3 pyramids of Giza | جمهورية مصر العربية ("Arab Republic of Egypt"); Value in Arabic; Hijri and Gregorian year in Arabic |
| 5 PT** | 1992 | | | 21 | 1.1 | 3.2 | Copper 92% Aluminium 8% | | Islamic pottery | جمهورية مصر العربية ("Arab Republic of Egypt"); Value in Arabic; Hijri and Gregorian year in Arabic |
| 5 PT** | 2004–2008 | | | 17 | 1.04 | 2.4 | Steel 94% Nickel 2% Copper plating 4% | | Islamic pottery | جمهورية مصر العربية ("Arab Republic of Egypt"); Value in Arabic; Hijri and Gregorian year in Arabic |
| 10 PT** | 1984 | | | 25 | 1.35 | 5.2 | Copper 75%Nickel 25% | | Mosque of Muhammad Ali | جمهورية مصر العربية ("Arab Republic of Egypt"); Value in Arabic; Hijri and Gregorian year in Arabic |
| 10 PT** | 1992 | | | 23 | 1.2 | 4.9 | Copper 95%Aluminum 5% | | Mosque of Muhammad Ali | جمهورية مصر العربية ("Arab Republic of Egypt"); Value in Arabic; Hijri and Gregorian year in Arabic |
| 10 PT** | 2008 | | | 19 | 1.1 | 3.2 | Steel 94% Copper 2% Nickel plating 4% | | Mosque of Muhammad Ali | جمهورية مصر العربية ("Arab Republic of Egypt"); Value in Arabic; Hijri and Gregorian year in Arabic |
| 20 PT** | 1984 | | | 27 | 1.4 | 6 | Copper 75%Nickel 25% | | Mosque of Muhammad Ali | جمهورية مصر العربية ("Arab Republic of Egypt"); Value in Arabic; Hijri and Gregorian year in Arabic |
| 20 PT** | 1992 | | | 25 | 1.35 | 5.2 | Copper 95% Aluminium 5% | | Al-Azhar mosque | جمهورية مصر العربية ("Arab Republic of Egypt"); Value in Arabic; Hijri and Gregorian year in Arabic |
| 25 PT | 1993** | | | 25 | 1.4 | 5.2 | Copper 95% Aluminium 5% | | Islamic illustration; Value in Arabic and in English | جمهورية مصر العربية ("Arab Republic of Egypt"); Hijri and Gregorian year in Arabic |
| 25 PT | 2008-22 | | | 21 | 1.26 | 4.5 | Steel 94% Copper 2% Nickel plating 4% | | Islamic illustration; Value in Arabic and in English | جمهورية مصر العربية ("Arab Republic of Egypt"); Hijri and Gregorian year in Arabic |
| 50 PT | 2005 | | | 25 | 1.58 | 6.5 | Copper 75% Zinc 20% Nickel 5% | | Cleopatra's head; Hijri and Gregorian year in Arabic | جمهورية مصر العربية ("Arab Republic of Egypt"); Value in Arabic and in English |
| 50 PT | 2007-21 | | | 23 | 1.7 | 6.5 | Steel 94% Nickel 2% Copper plating 4% | | Cleopatra's head; Hijri and Gregorian year in Arabic | جمهورية مصر العربية ("Arab Republic of Egypt"); Value in Arabic and in English |
| £1*** | 2005 | | | 25 | 1.89 | 8.5 | Bimetal | | Tutankhamun's mask | جمهورية مصر العربية ("Arab Republic of Egypt"); Value in Arabic and in English; Hijri and Gregorian year in Arabic |
| £1*** | 2005 | | | 25 | 1.89 | 8.5 | Ring | Centre | Tutankhamun's mask | جمهورية مصر العربية ("Arab Republic of Egypt"); Value in Arabic and in English; Hijri and Gregorian year in Arabic |
| £1*** | 2005 | | | 25 | 1.89 | 8.5 | Copper 75% Nickel 25% | Copper 75% Zinc 20% Nickel 5% | Tutankhamun's mask | جمهورية مصر العربية ("Arab Republic of Egypt"); Value in Arabic and in English; Hijri and Gregorian year in Arabic |
| £1*** | 2007–2022 | | | 25 | 1.96 | 8.5 | Steel 94% Copper 2% Nickel plating 4% | Steel 94% Nickel 2% Copper plating 4% | Tutankhamun's mask | جمهورية مصر العربية ("Arab Republic of Egypt"); Value in Arabic and in English; Hijri and Gregorian year in Arabic |

* 1 para = 1/40 piastre.

** Not in circulation as of 2008 (Still legal tender nevertheless).

*** As to commemorate the branching of the Suez canal, the obverse had the Arabic phrase, قناة السويس الجديدة "New Suez Canal".

== Banknotes ==
In 1899, the National Bank of Egypt introduced notes in denominations of 50 PT, £1, £5, £10, £50, and £100. Between 1916 and 1917, 25 PT notes were added, together with government currency notes for 5 PT and 10 PT issued by the Ministry of Finance. In 1961, the Central Bank of Egypt took over from the National Bank and issued notes in denominations of 25 and 50 piastres, £1, £5, £10 and £20 notes were introduced in 1976, followed by £100 in 1978, £50 in 1993 and £200 in 2007.

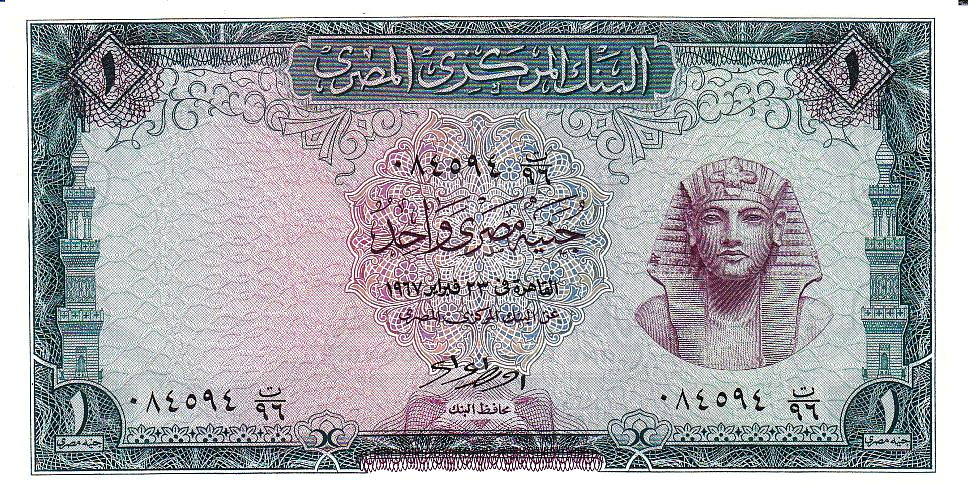
Obverse of the 1967 issue of E£1 banknote

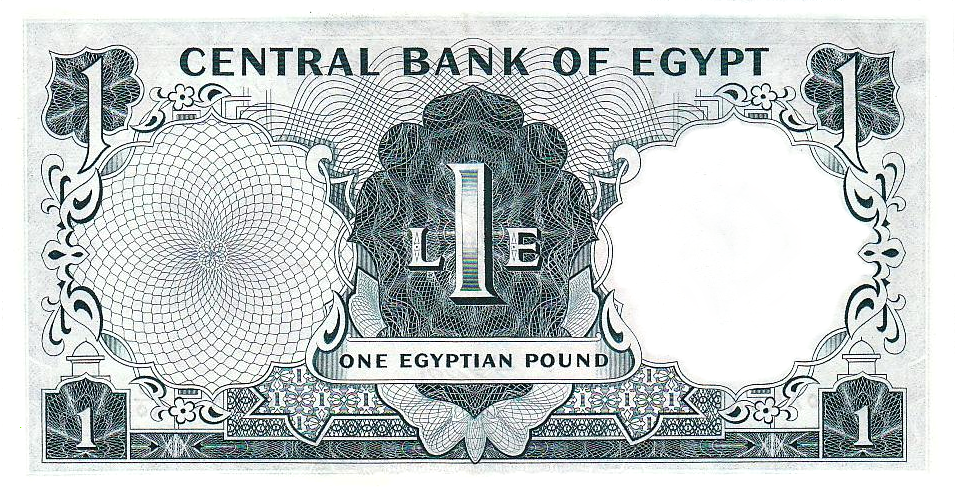
Reverse of the 1967 issue of E£1 banknote

All Egyptian banknotes are bilingual, with Arabic texts and Eastern Arabic numerals on the obverse, and English texts and Western Arabic numerals on the reverse. Obverse designs tend to feature an Islamic building with reverse designs featuring Ancient Egyptian motifs (buildings, statues and inscriptions). During December 2006, it was mentioned in articles in Al Ahram and Al Akhbar newspapers that there were plans to introduce £200 and £500 notes. As of 2024, there are £200 notes circulating but there are still no plans for issuing £500 notes. Starting from 2011 the 25 PT, 50 PT and £1 banknotes were phased out in favour of more extensive use of coins. However, as of June 2016 the National Bank of Egypt reintroduced the £1 banknote into circulation as well as 25 PT and 50 PT notes in response to a shortage of small change.

The governor of the Central Bank of Egypt announced that the Central Bank of Egypt will issue polymer notes by the beginning of 2021. This change comes as the CBE moves its headquarters to the new administrative capital. On July 31, 2021, the President of Egypt reviewed the notes of £10 and £20, to be issued in November 2021. In August 2021, the Central Bank was forced to confirm that rainbow holograms on the new banknotes were a secure watermarking feature to prevent counterfeiting, after online critics suggested it was a covert message of support for LGBT rights. Just nearly 2 years after the £10 note was released, the Central Bank of Egypt released the new £20 polymer banknote. The paper variants of the same denominations will continue to be legal tender.

Current series of the Egyptian pound
| Image | | Value | Dimensions (millimeters) | Main color | Description | | Year of first issue |
| Reverse | Obverse | Value | Dimensions (millimeters) | Main color | Reverse | Obverse | Year of first issue |
|---|---|---|---|---|---|---|---|
| | | 25 PT | 130 × 70 | Blue | Ayesha mosque | Coat of arms of Egypt | 1985 |
| | | 50 PT | 135 × 70 | Brown/yellow-green | Al-Azhar Mosque | Ramesses II | 1985 |
| | | £1 | 140 × 70 | Beige | Mosque and mausoleum of Qaitbay | Abu Simbel temples | 1978 |
| | | £5 | 145 × 70 | Bluish-green | Mosque of Ibn Tulun | A Pharaonic engraving of Hapi (god of the annual flooding of the Nile) offering bounties. | 1981 |
| | | £10 | 132 × 69 | Orange | Al-Fattah Al-Aleem Mosque | Hatshepsut | 2022 |
| | | £20 | 137 × 69 | Mint Green | Muhammad Ali Mosque | A Pharaonic war chariot and Queen Cleopatra | 2023 |
| | | £50 | 160 × 70 | Brownish-red | Abu Hurayba Mosque (Qijmas al-Ishaqi Mosque) | Temple of Edfu | 1993 |
| | | £100 | 165 × 70 | Cyan | Sultan Hassan Mosque | Great Sphinx of Giza | 1994 |
| | | £200 | 165 × 72 | Olive | Mosque of Qani-Bay | The Seated Scribe | 2007 |

== See also ==
- Economy of Egypt
- Economy of Africa
- Egyptian gold stater

Current EGP exchange rates
| From Google Finance: | AUD CAD CHF CNY EUR GBP HKD JPY USD ILS JOD TRY |
| From Yahoo! Finance: | AUD CAD CHF CNY EUR GBP HKD JPY USD ILS JOD TRY |
| From XE.com: | AUD CAD CHF CNY EUR GBP HKD JPY USD ILS JOD TRY |
| From OANDA: | AUD CAD CHF CNY EUR GBP HKD JPY USD ILS JOD TRY |

== Bibliography ==
- Krause, Chester L.; Clifford Mishler (1991). Standard Catalog of World Coins: 1801–1991 (18th ed.). Krause Publications. ISBN 0873411501.
- Pick, Albert (1994). Bruce, Colin R. II; Shafer, Neil (eds.). Standard Catalog of World Paper Money: General Issues (7th ed.). Krause Publications. ISBN 0-87341-207-9.
