= Amir Qijmas al-Ishaqi Mosque =

Mosque in Cairo, Egypt

- مسجد قجماس الإسحاقي
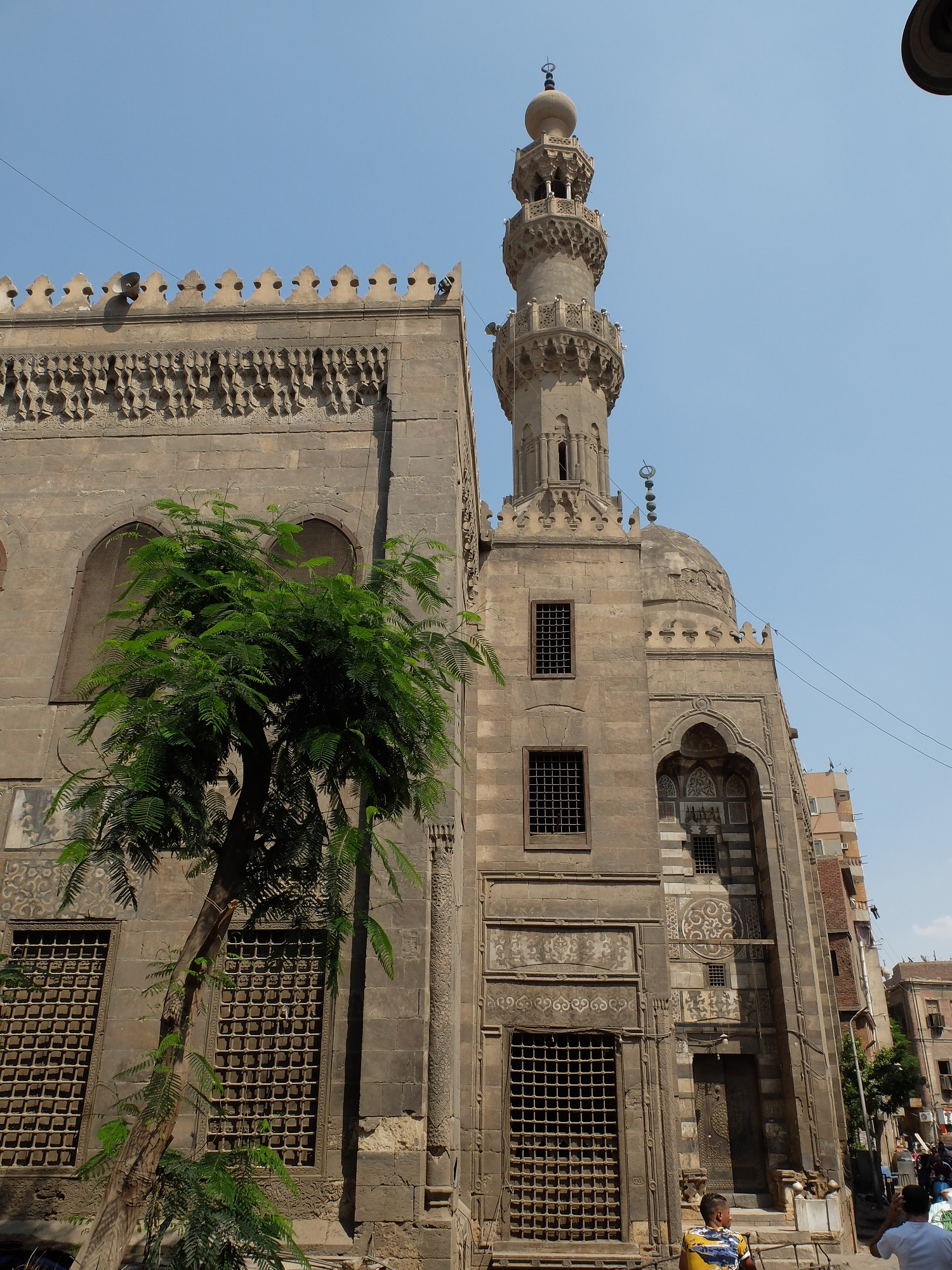

Religion
- Affiliation: Islam
- Ecclesiastical or organisational status: Mosque; Madrasa; Mausoleum
- Status: Active

Location
- Location: Al-Darb al-Ahmar, Islamic Cairo
- Country: Egypt
- Interactive map of Amir Qijmas al-Ishaqi Mosque
- Coordinates: 30°02′29″N 31°15′27″E

Architecture
- Type: Mosque, madrasa, mausoleum
- Style: Mamluk; Islamic
- Founder: Sayf al-Din Qijmas al-Ishaqi
- Completed: 1481

Specifications
- Dome: 1
- Minaret: 1
- Materials: Stone; timber; marble; stucco

The Amir Qijmas al-Ishaqi Mosque (Arabic: مسجد قجماس الإسحاقي), also known as the Abu Hurayba Mosque (Arabic: مسجد أبو حريبة; sometimes transliterated as Abu Heriba), is a mosque, madrasa and mausoleum complex, located in the al-Darb al-Ahmar district of Islamic Cairo, Egypt. The mosque was completed in c. 1481, during the late Mamluk-era, and is considered by many to be one of the finest examples of late Mamluk architecture. It is located near Bab Zuwayla.

== History ==
The mosque was likely begun in the late 1470s and completed in 1480–1481 CE. It was commissioned by a Burji Mamluk amir called Sayf al-Din Qijmas al-Ishaqi who served during the rule of Sultan Qaitbay. He served in several highly important positions such as amir akhur (officer in charge of the royal stables) and amir al-hajj (officer in charge of the pilgrimage to Mecca, the Hajj). He was also appointed governor of Alexandria in 1470 and then governor of Syria in 1480, a position he retained until his peaceful death in 1487. During his tenure in Syria he built a new tomb for himself in Damascus and he was buried there instead of in the mausoleum of the mosque he had built in Cairo.

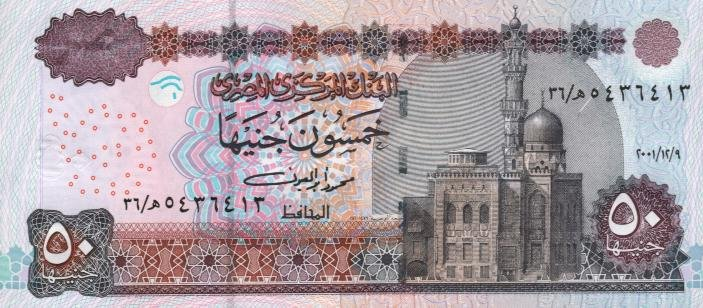
A E£50 banknote in 2001 that featured the mosque

His mosque in Cairo was built on what was then the main road between the southern city gate, Bab Zuwayla, and the Citadel of Cairo, passing through what is now known as the Al-Darb al-Ahmar district. The mosque's popular name, the Mosque of Abu Hurayba (or Abu Heriba, among other spellings), is derived from the Sheikh Abu Hurayba, who was known as a wali and was buried in the domed mausoleum in 1852.

The mosque was featured on the E£50 banknote.

== Architecture ==
=== Overview and layout ===
The mosque is considered a remarkable example of late Mamluk architecture, especially due to the architect's ingenious arrangement of the building's different elements to make them fit into an irregular plot of land in the angle between El-Darb El-Ahmar Street and another lane joining it to the north. Such creative layouts were characteristic of Mamluk buildings as Cairo's density increased and builders were forced to adapt to limited available land. The main part of the site is roughly shaped like a right triangle, between the angle of the two streets, while an annex stands across the lane to the north and is connected to the main building via a raised passage (sabat) above the street.

=== Exterior ===
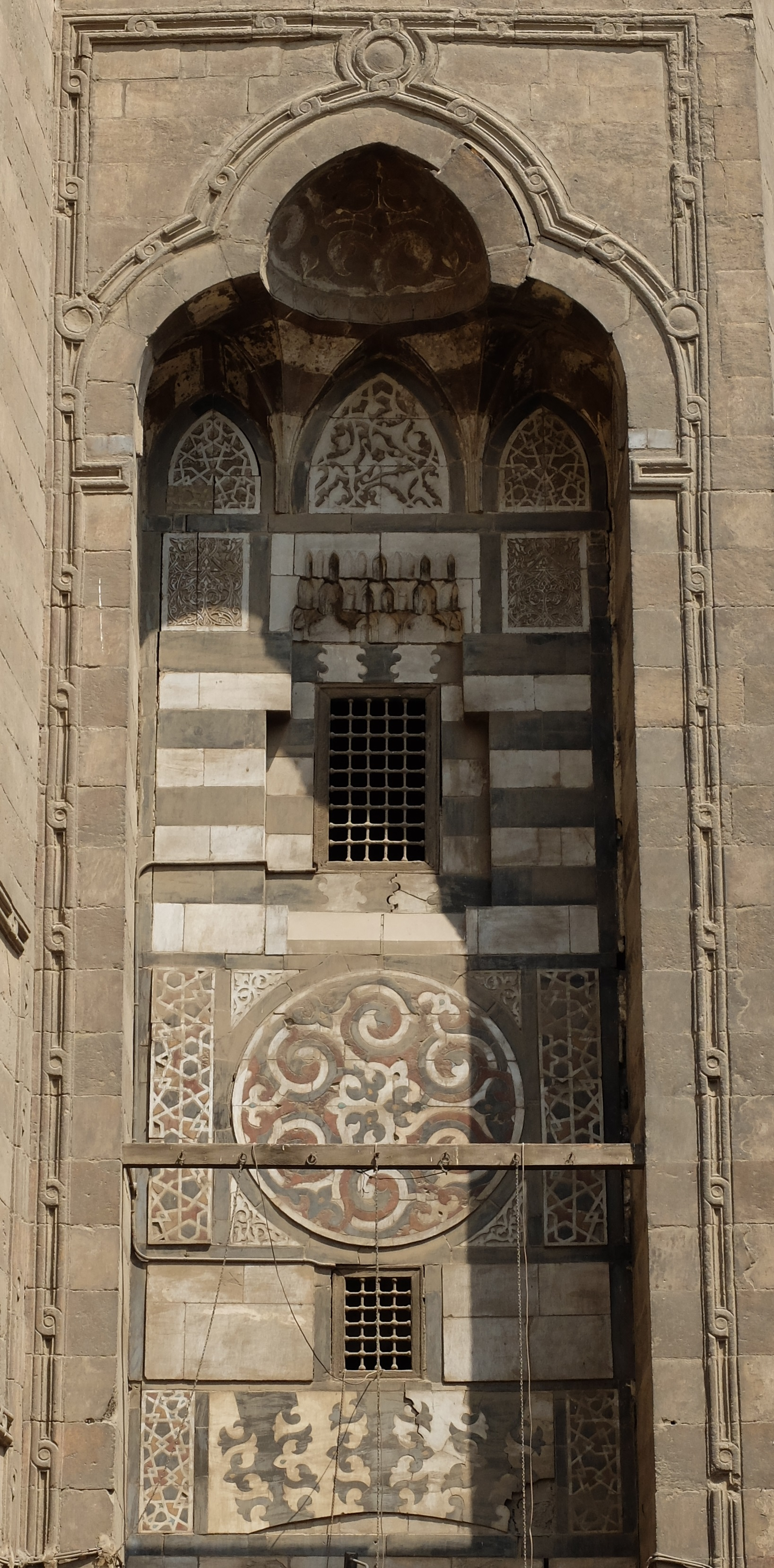
The decoration of the entrance portal

The main building includes the mosque, the domed mausoleum, the minaret, and the sabil. The exterior of the building is partitioned into multiple facades that reveal themselves one after another to anyone walking down the main street coming from Bab Zuweila, projecting towards the street but without impeding traffic. All around the base of the building, and built into it, are shops which provided revenues for the mosque, while the mosque is raised above these and its entrance is reached by a set of stairs (a recurring arrangement dating from the much older and nearby Mosque of Salih Tala'i).

The exterior of the mosque is marked by highly refined decoration exemplifying the sophisticated architectural style of Qaitbay's reign. This decoration includes arabesque stone carvings, rows of muqarnas carvings above the windows, and compositions of multi-colored (red, black and white) inlaid marble. The circular marble medallion above the entrance, forming a swirling pattern, is considered particularly remarkable and unmatched. The wooden doors of the entrance are overlaid with decorative bronze fittings. The doors once had metal knockers carved in an elaborate design featuring two dragon heads (similar to a famous Anatolian example now on display in the Museum of Turkish and Islamic Arts in Istanbul), but they were stolen. Another secondary entrance to the mosque, at the back of the building, is marked by further panels of exquisite decoration above.

The annex to the north of the main building consists of a water trough for animals (known as a hod), enclosed by walls with further stone-carved decoration, and above this a kuttab. In Mamluk architecture the kuttab is more typically located above the sabil, so its location here, separated from the sabil, is uncommon. The hammam and ablutions area of the mosque are also located here. The bridge passage between the two parts of the complex also has an upper level with mashrabiyya windows, suggesting this may have been used as living quarters or a residential unit.

Exterior views and details

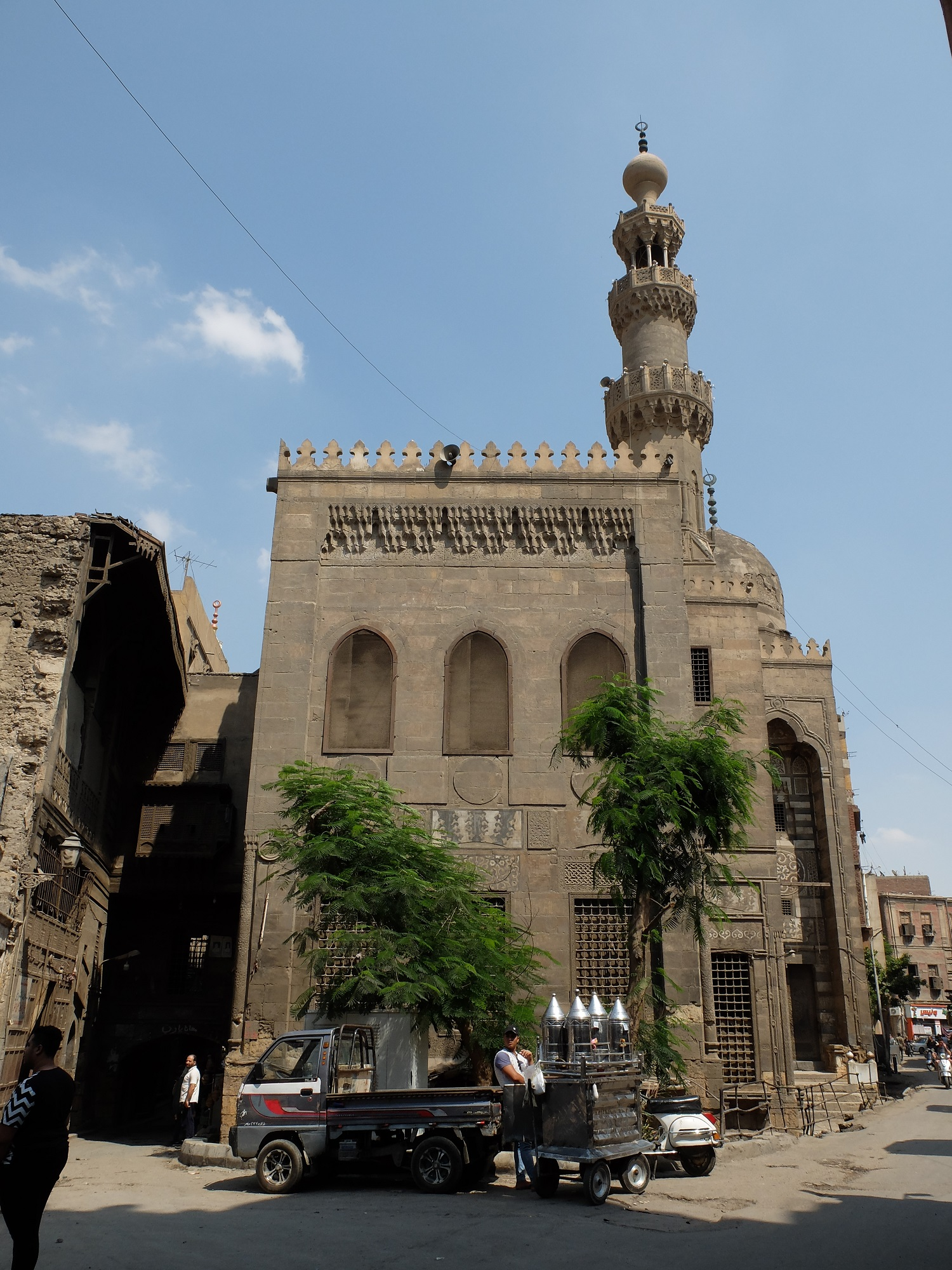
Overall view of the complex (from the west)

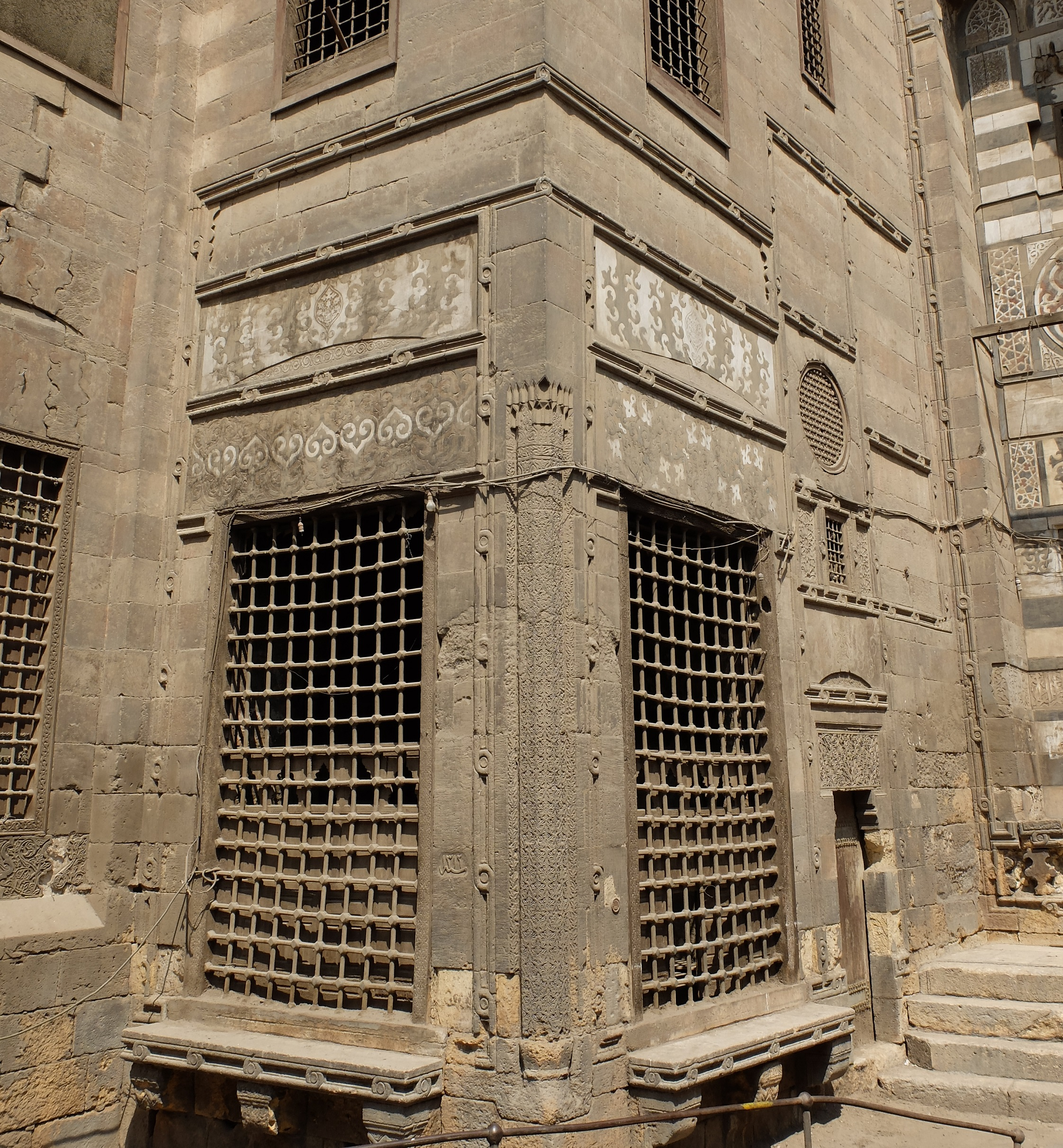
The sabil

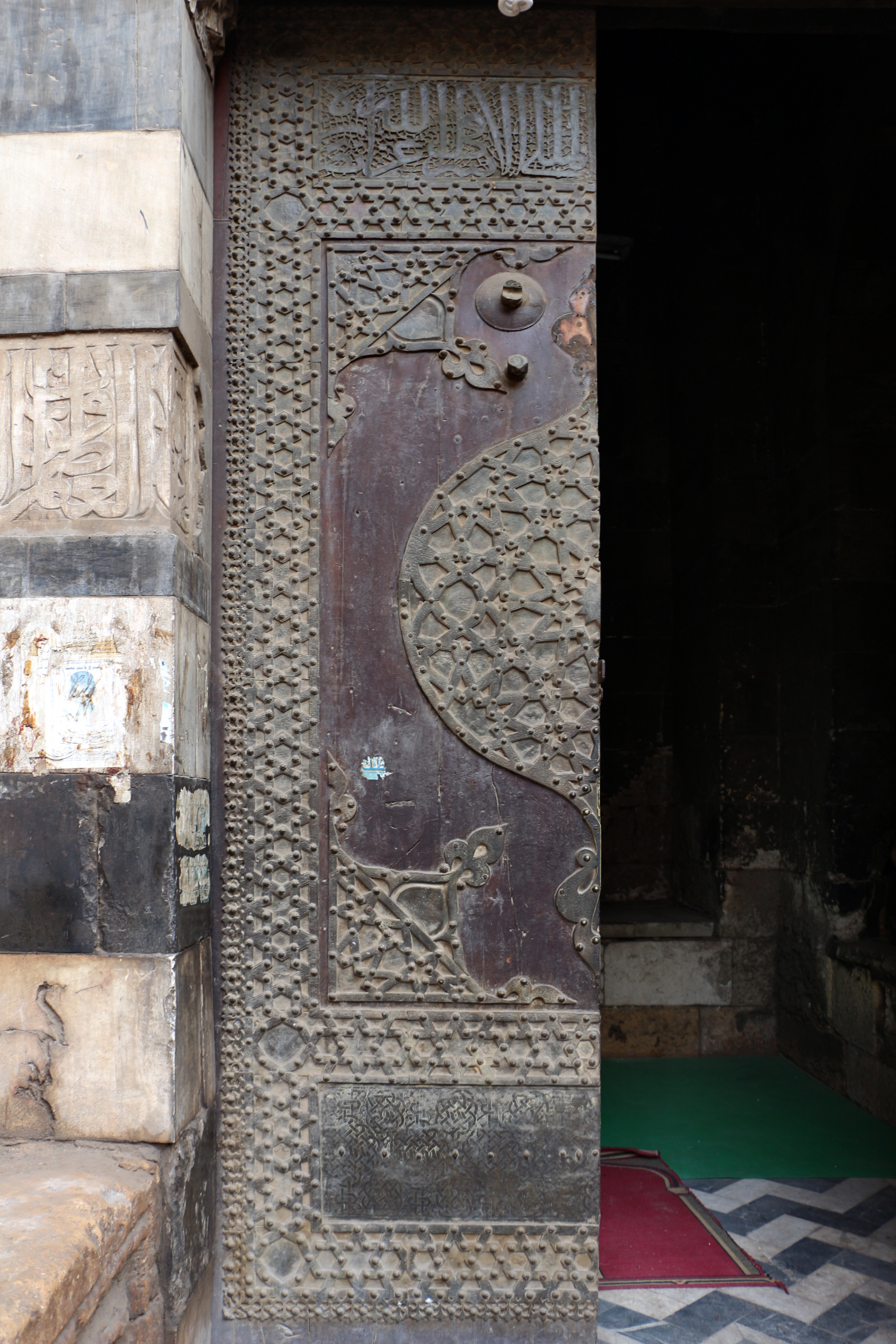
The doors of the mosque, made of wood overlaid with bronze fittings

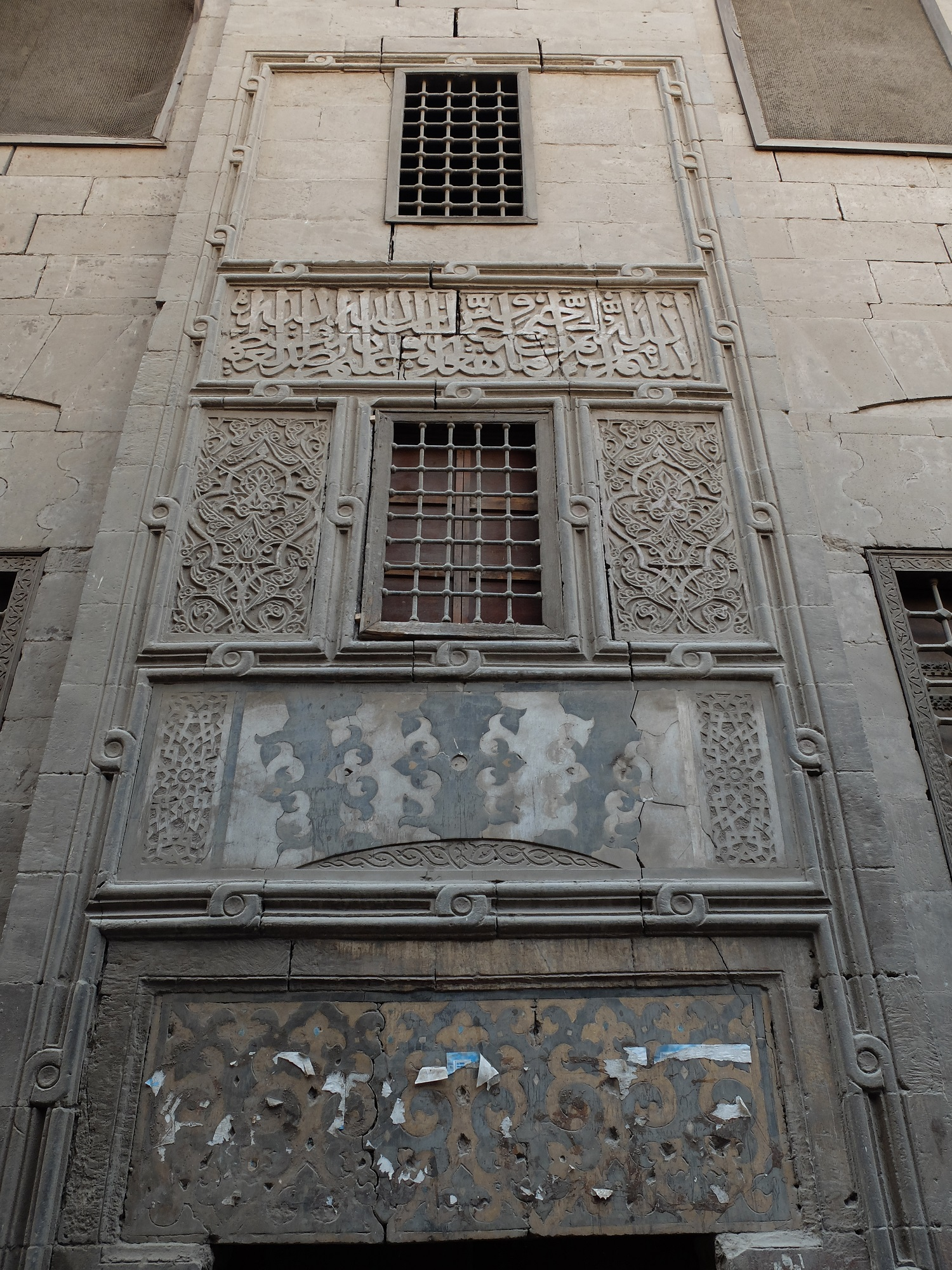
The decoration on the exterior wall above the mosque's rear entrance doors

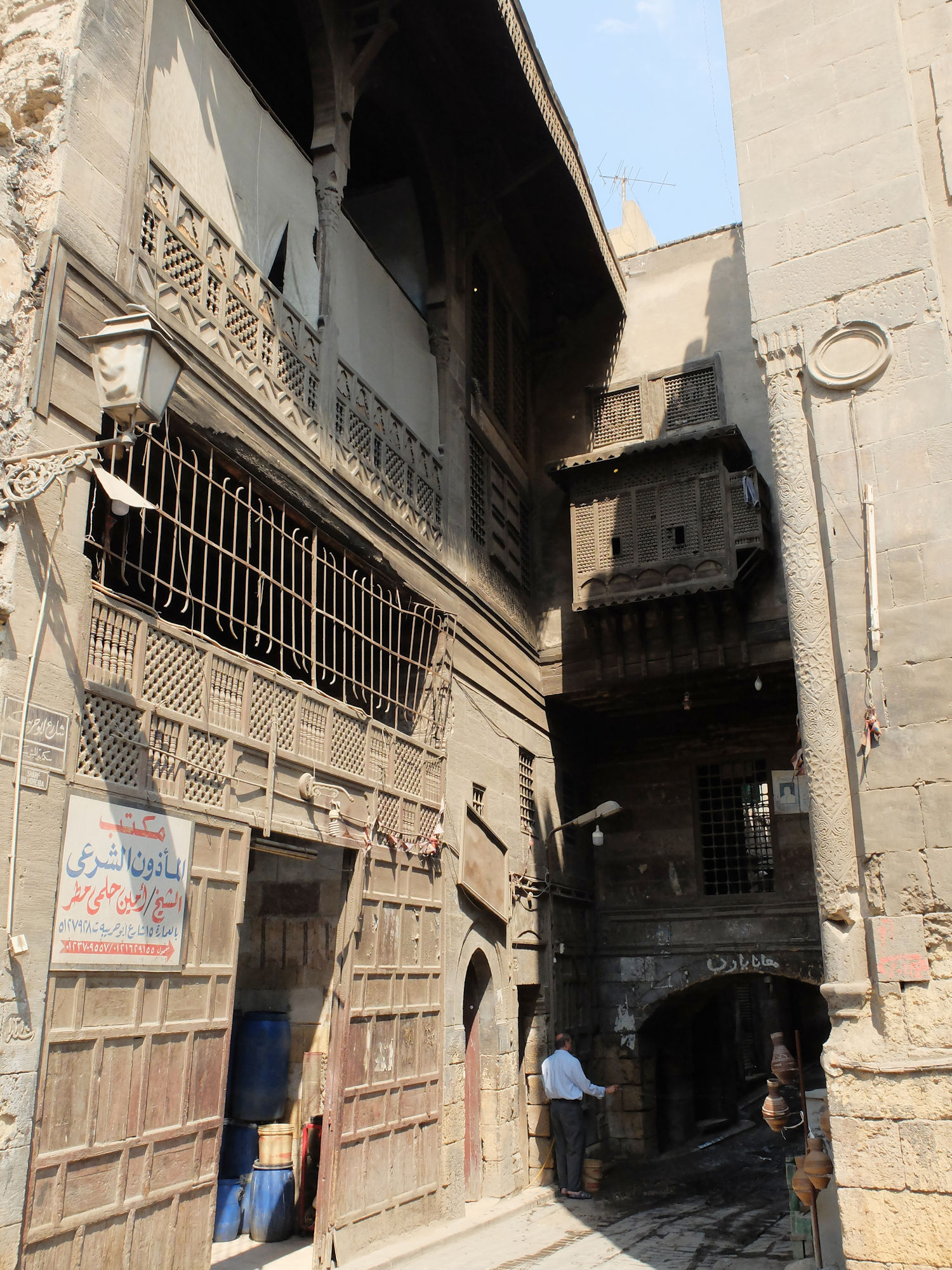
The raised passage linking the main building (right) and the annex (left).

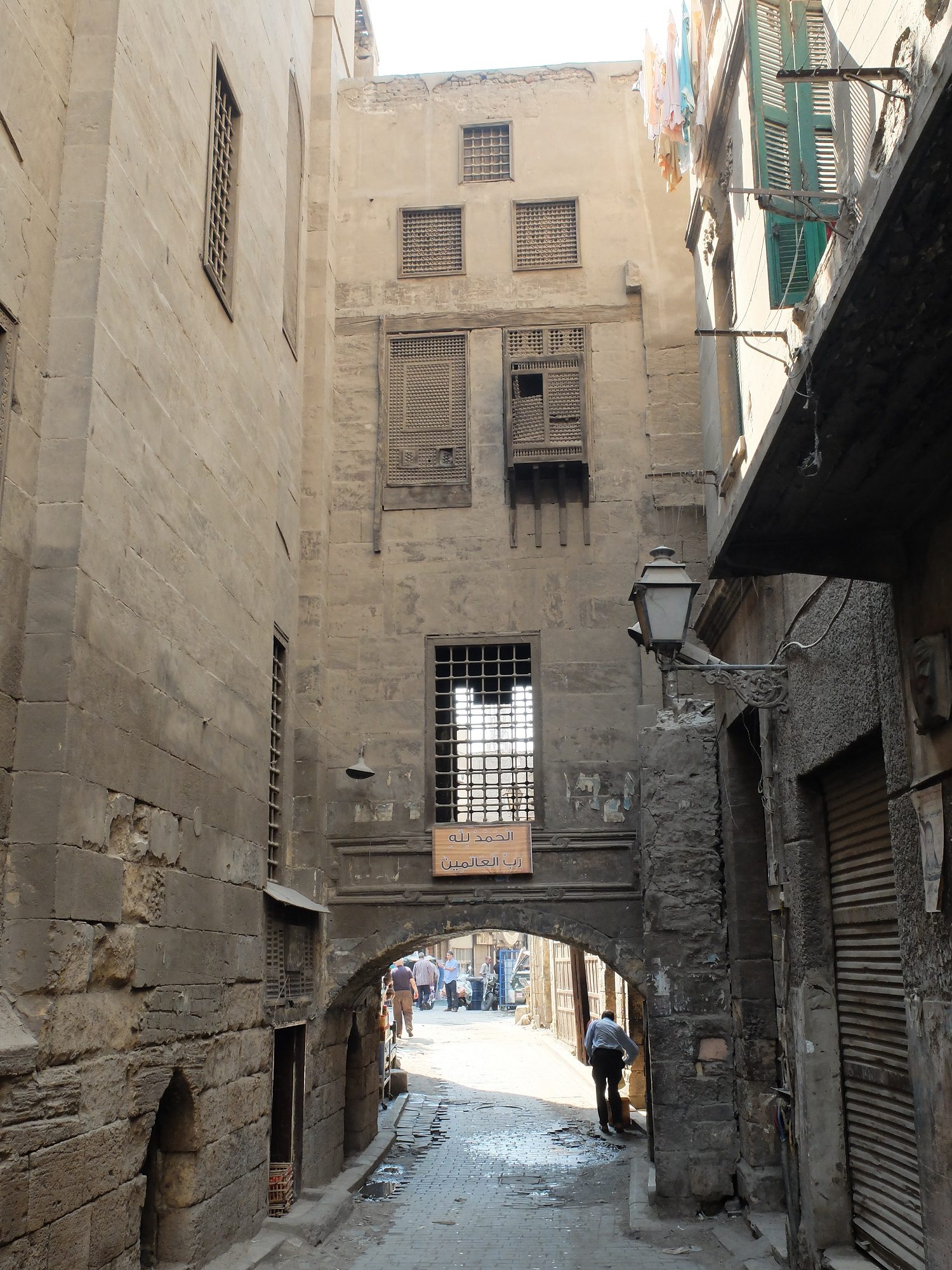
View of the raised passage from the east

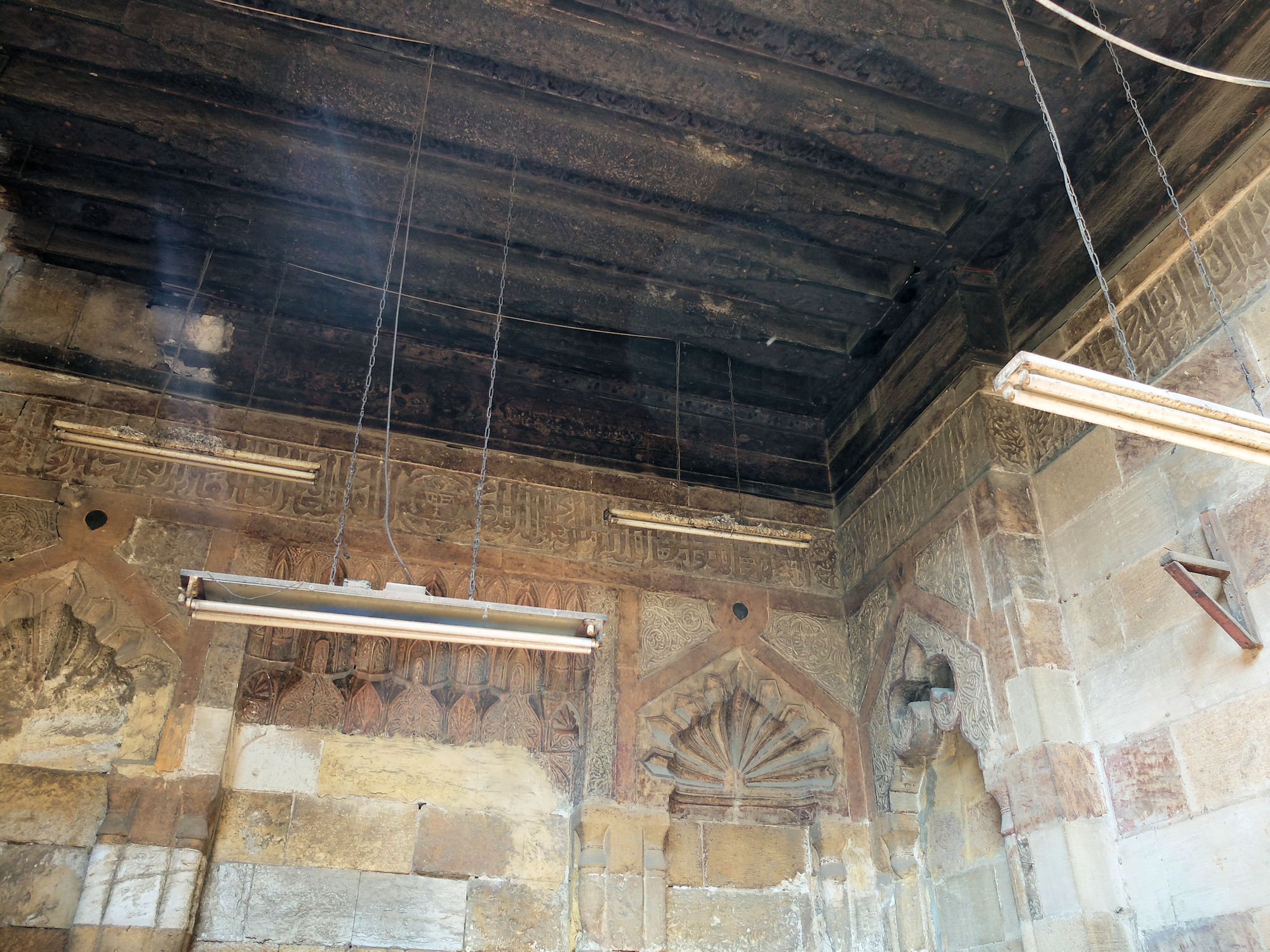
The stone decoration around the hod (water trough)

=== Interior ===
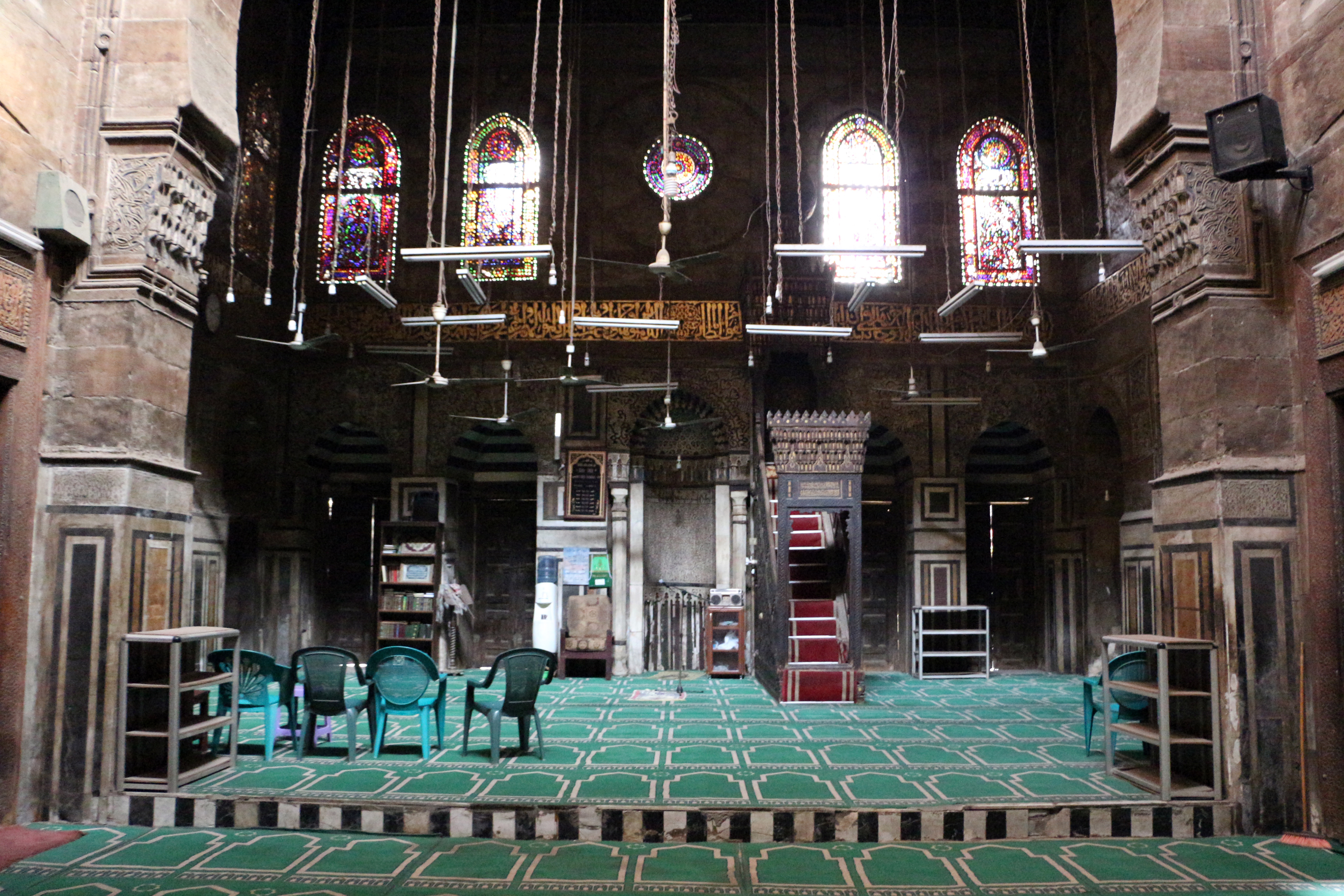
Interior of the mosque, looking towards the qibla-side iwan

The main entrance leads to the mosque via a vestibule with a richly decorated ceiling and a passage interrupted by a large skylight. This passage between the vestibule and the mosque is also joined by another passage leading from the mosque's rear entrance. At the end of the passage, at the entrance to the mosque area, is a set of wooden sliding doors, one of only two such examples in Mamluk architecture.

The mosque interior has a layout which had evolved from earlier "cruciform" madrasas and is equivalent to a qa'a (reception hall). It has two main iwans (large rooms open to one side) to the west and east, including the qibla side (the direction of prayer), and two smaller iwans to the north and south. Between these iwans is a central space which, in earlier buildings, used to be a sahn, but here is covered by a wooden roof with a broad lantern. The iwans are raised one step above this central area. This type of layout is found in many other buildings of this era, including the Funerary complex of Qaytbay and the madrasa of the Sultan al-Ghuri Complex. The mausoleum chamber of the building, which is plain but covered by a dome, is accessed through the qibla-side iwan.

The decoration of the interior is also very rich, featuring ablaq (two-colored) masonry, marble paneling along the lower walls (dadoes), Arabic inscriptions, and stone carvings. The monumental inscription in golden thuluth Arabic script running around the upper walls describes the piety of amir Qijmas. The wooden lantern ceiling above this is decorated with geometric patterns, while the wooden ceilings of the iwans are gilded and decorated with painted arabesque patterns. The floors of the mosque are paved with decorative marble (but are typically covered by the mosque's carpeting). The windows feature coloured glass set into stucco grilles. The appearance of cypress tree motifs in the windows suggests that the current stucco grilles may date to an Ottoman-era restoration.

Interior details

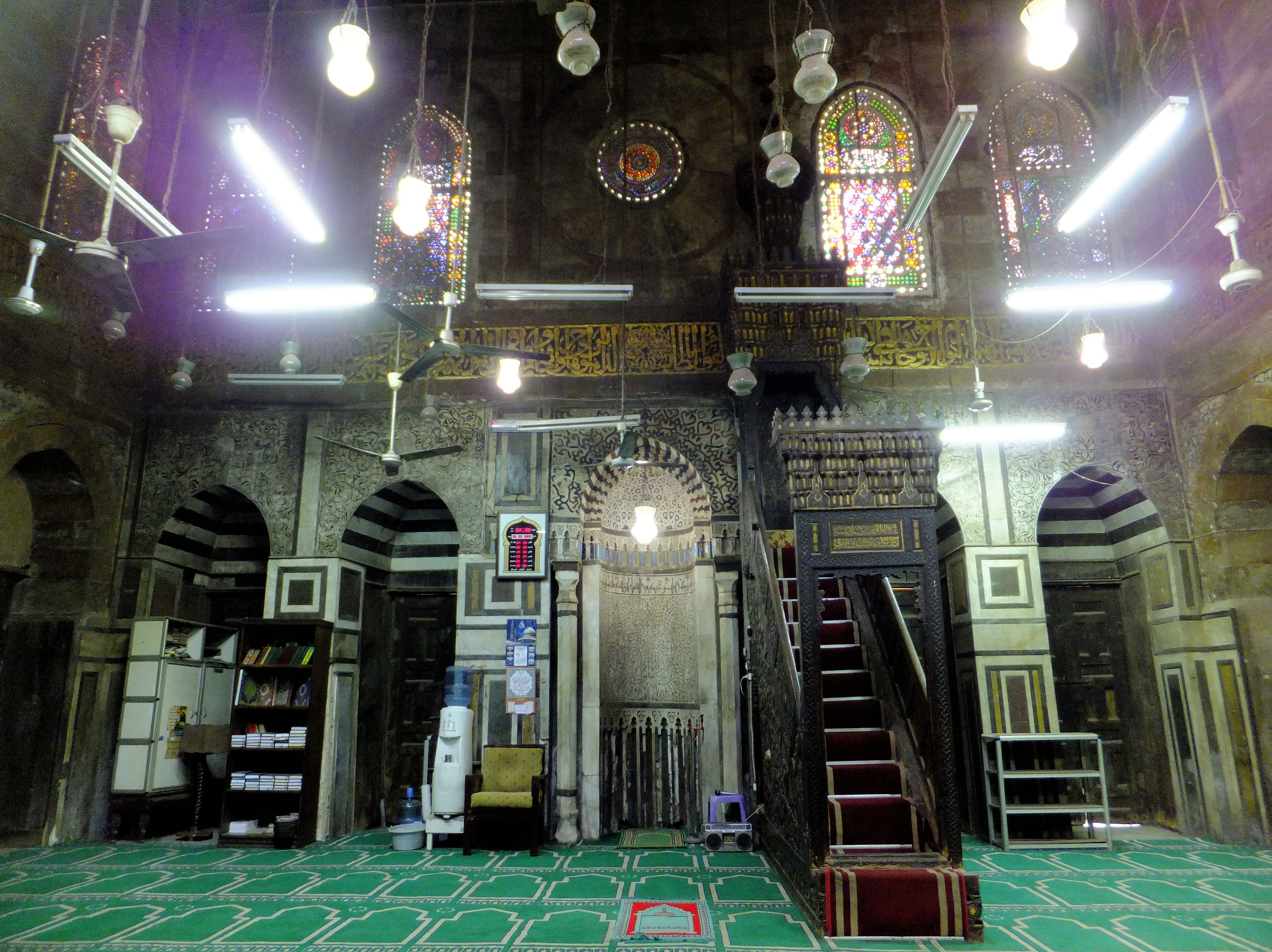
The qibla wall of the mosque, including the mihrab and minbar

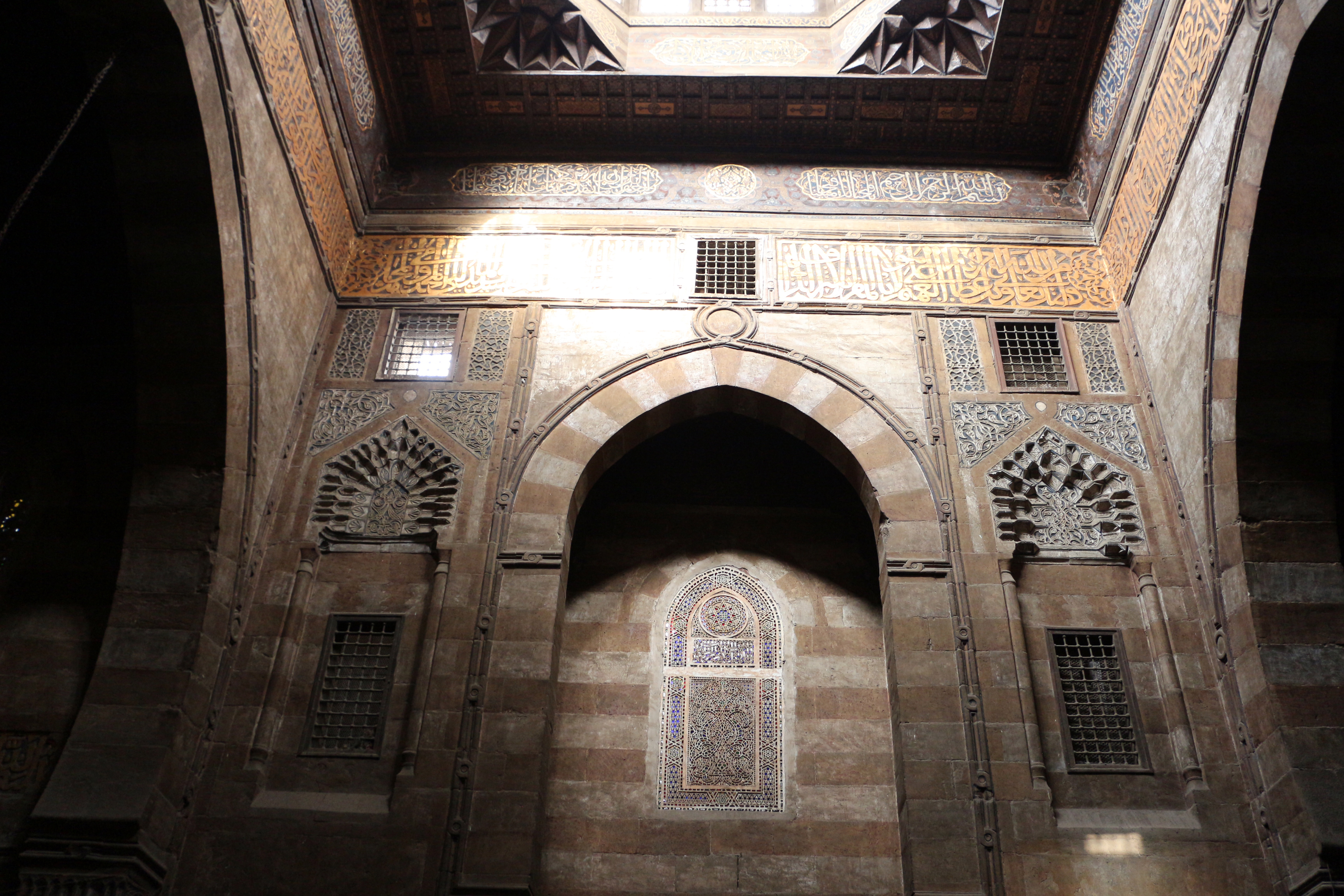
The walls and one of the smaller iwans in the mosque's covered courtyard. A monumental Arabic inscription in thuluth script runs around the upper walls.

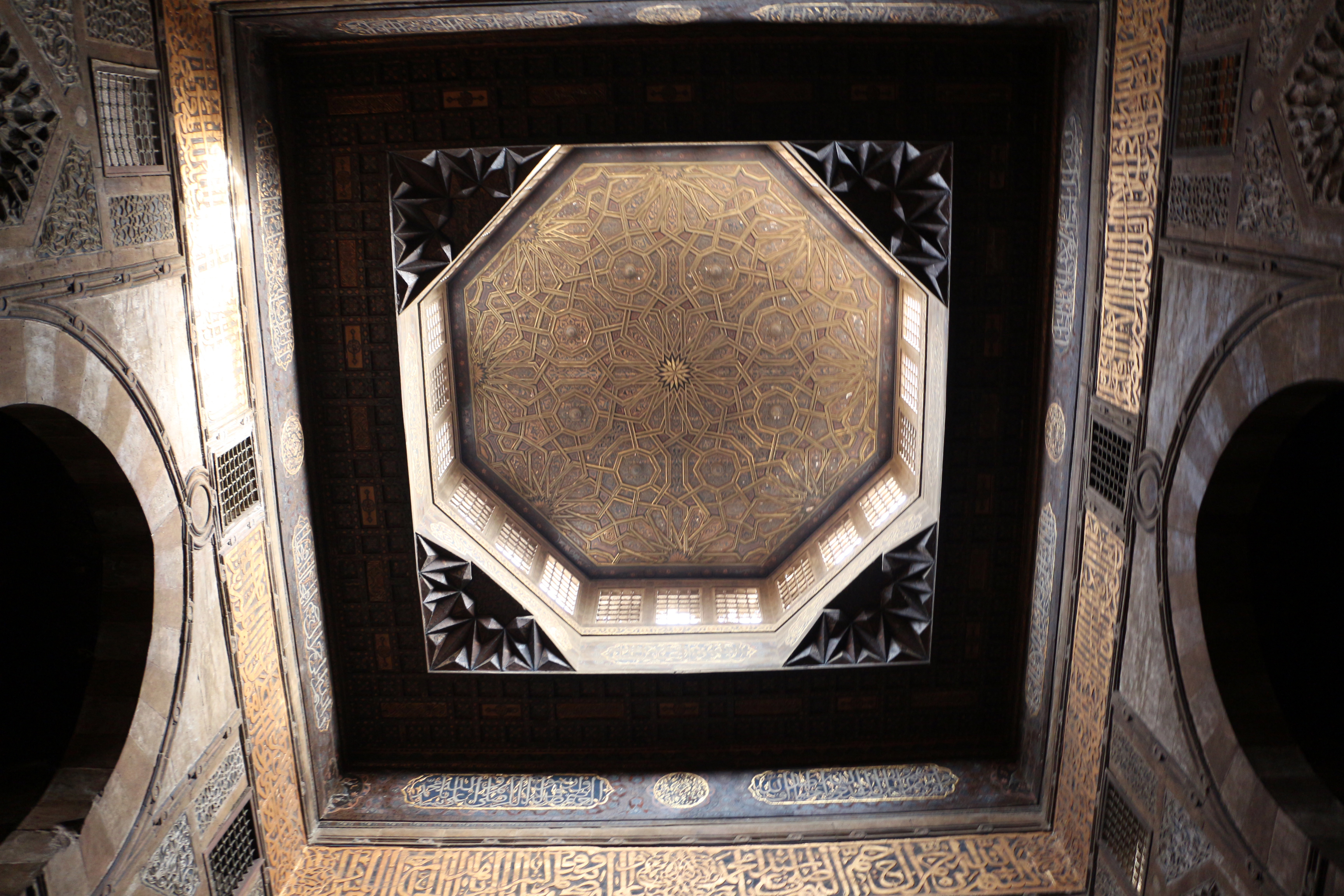
The lantern ceiling of the mosque

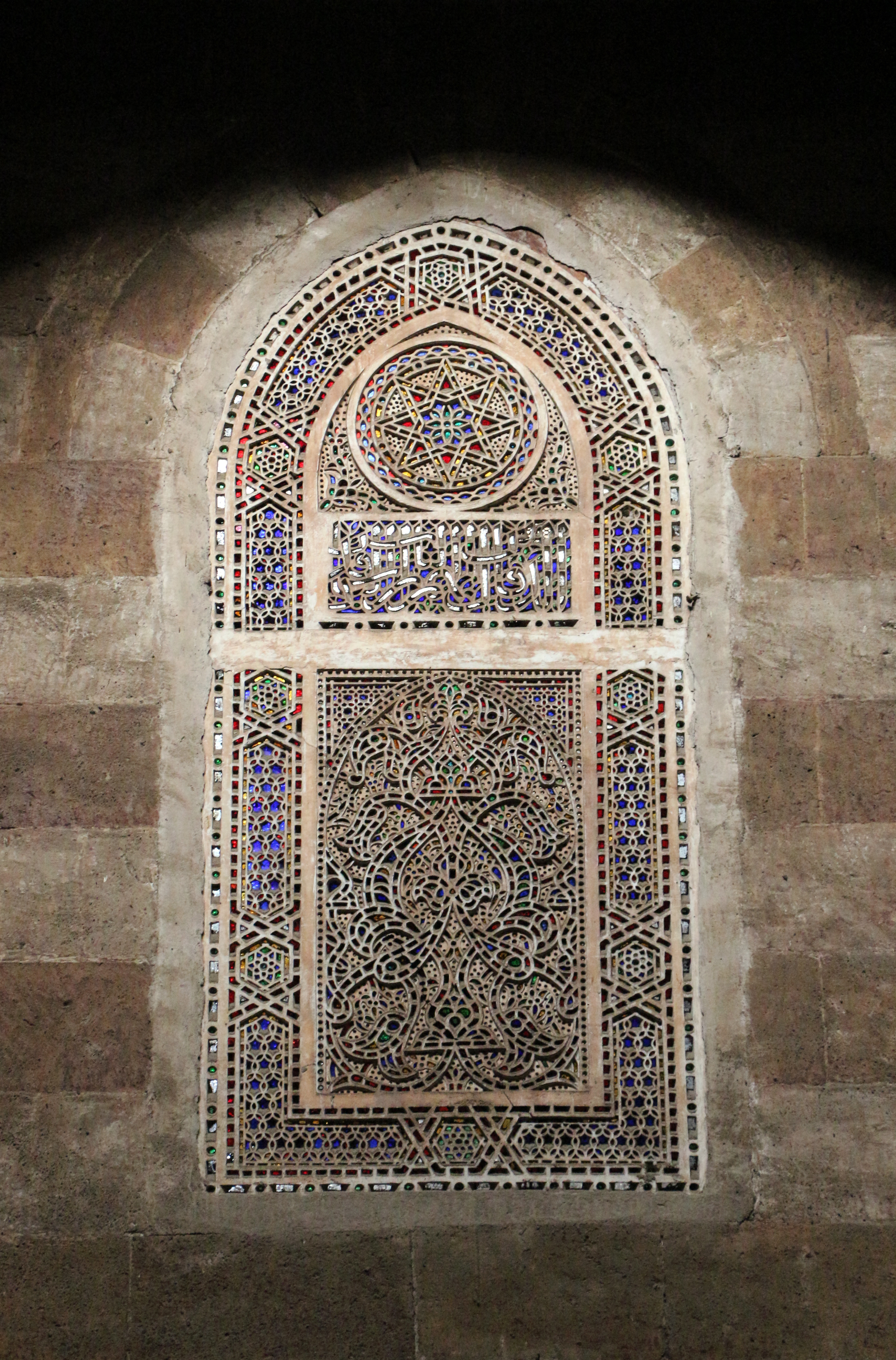
One of the windows of coloured glass set into a stucco grille

==== Mihrab ====
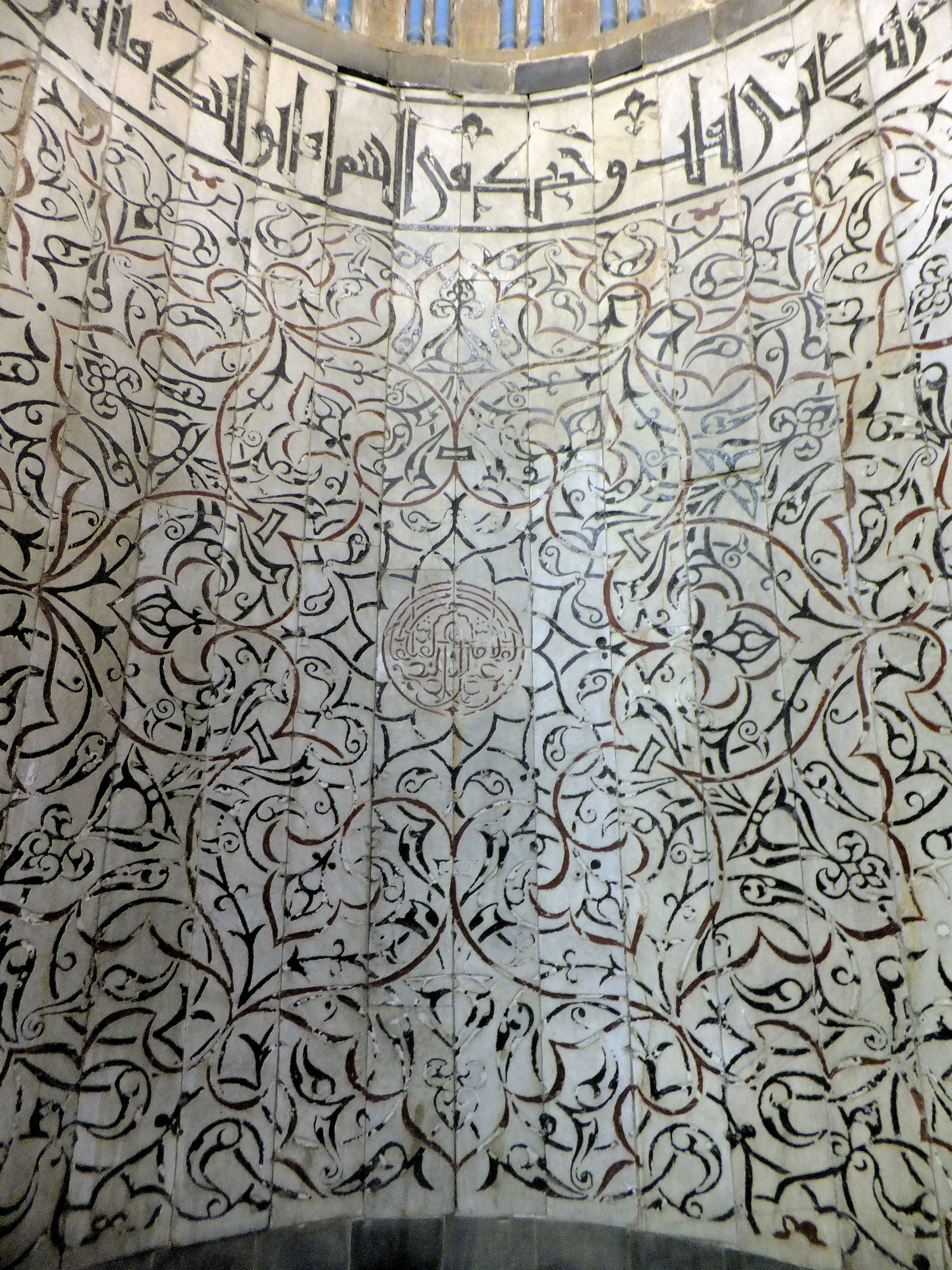
Close-up of the mihrab, showing the white marble inlaid with black paste to form fine arabesque patterns. At the middle, inside the central rosette, is the signature of the craftsman. At the top is a Qur'anic inscription in Kufic style.

The mihrab and the qibla wall around it feature an unprecedented decorative technique: white marble inlaid with thin lines of black bitumen and red paste to form elaborate arabesque patterns. This new technique, later re-used elsewhere, may have reflected a scarcity of marble materials needed to execute the usual multi-coloured marble mosaics seen in earlier Mamluk buildings, or it may have been motivated by a desire to form more intricate patterns not possible with those earlier techniques. Most of the mihrab is covered with this type of decoration, at the middle of which is a star or flower-shaped rosette which contains the mirrored signature of the craftsman, named as 'Abd al-Qadir "the Engraver" (al-Naqqash). Such a signature at the middle of the mihrab, a niche which symbolizes the direction of prayer, is considered highly unusual in mosque architecture. The conch (semi-dome) of the mihrab niche is covered with more conventional geometric star patterns, with the name Allah appearing at the middle of some of the stars. Just below the conch is a Qur'anic inscription (part of verse 2:144, in the Surah al-Baqarah) in Kufic script. The voussoirs around the arch of the mihrab are in turn inlaid with arabesque patterns similar to those of the mihrab of the Mosque of al-Mu'ayyad.

The surfaces of the wooden minbar of the mosque are decorated with geometric sixteen-pointed star patterns emanating from round bosses. The decorative effect is achieved by different coloured inlays instead of the deep carvings of earlier minbars.

Mihrab and minbar details

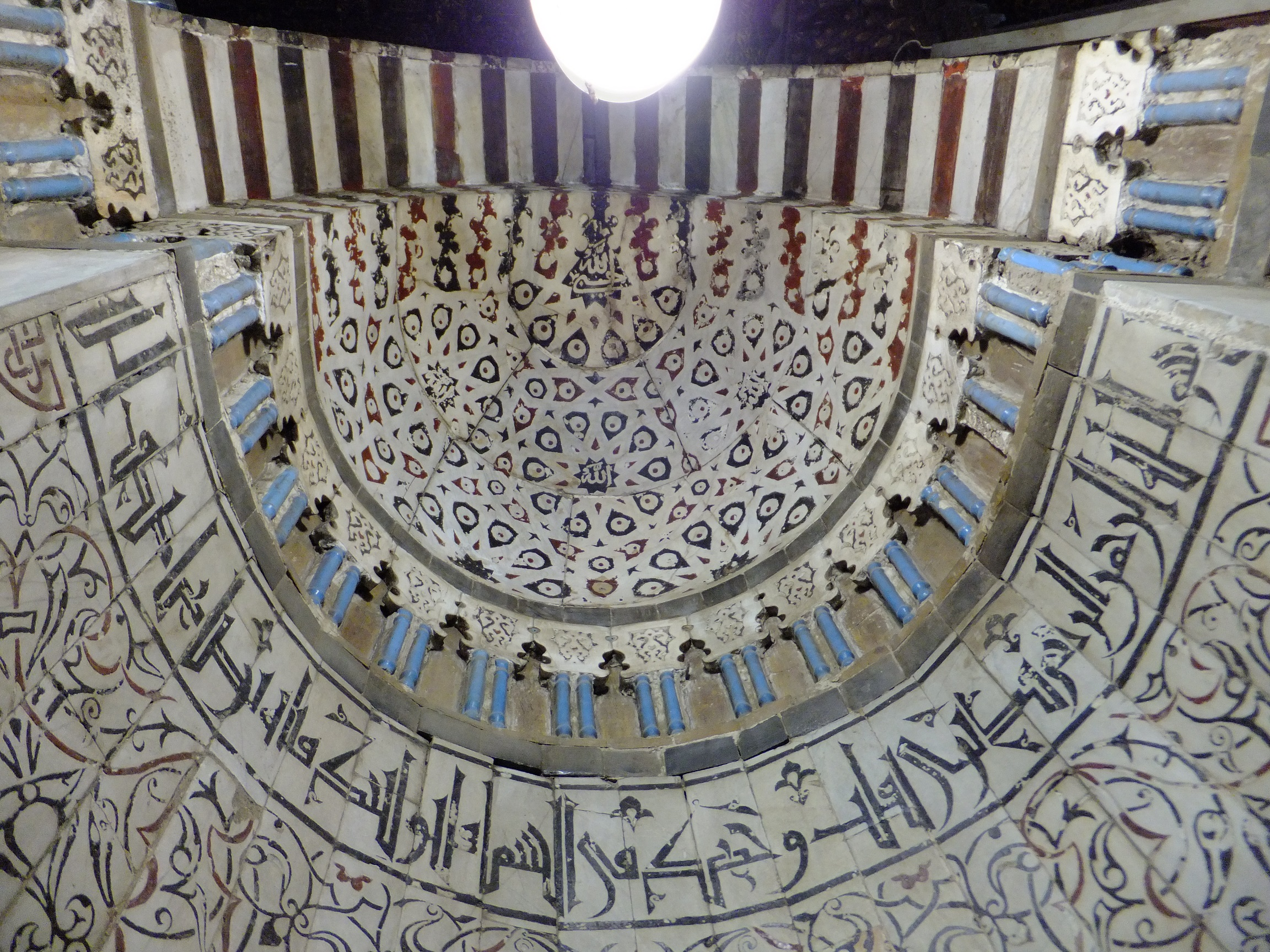
Close-up of the mihrab's conch (semi-dome)

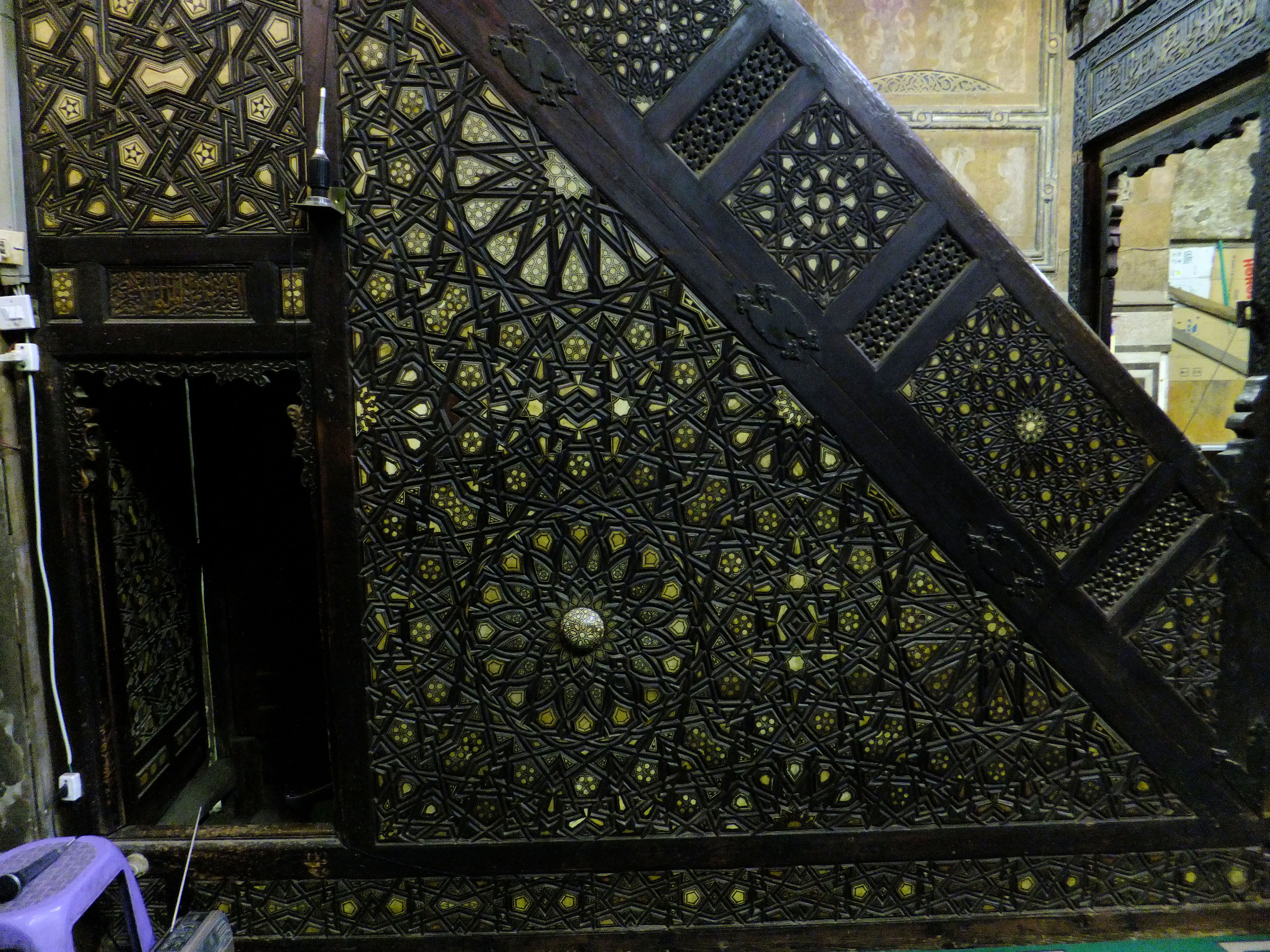
The minbar of the mosque, made of wood with geometric star patterns inlaid with ivory

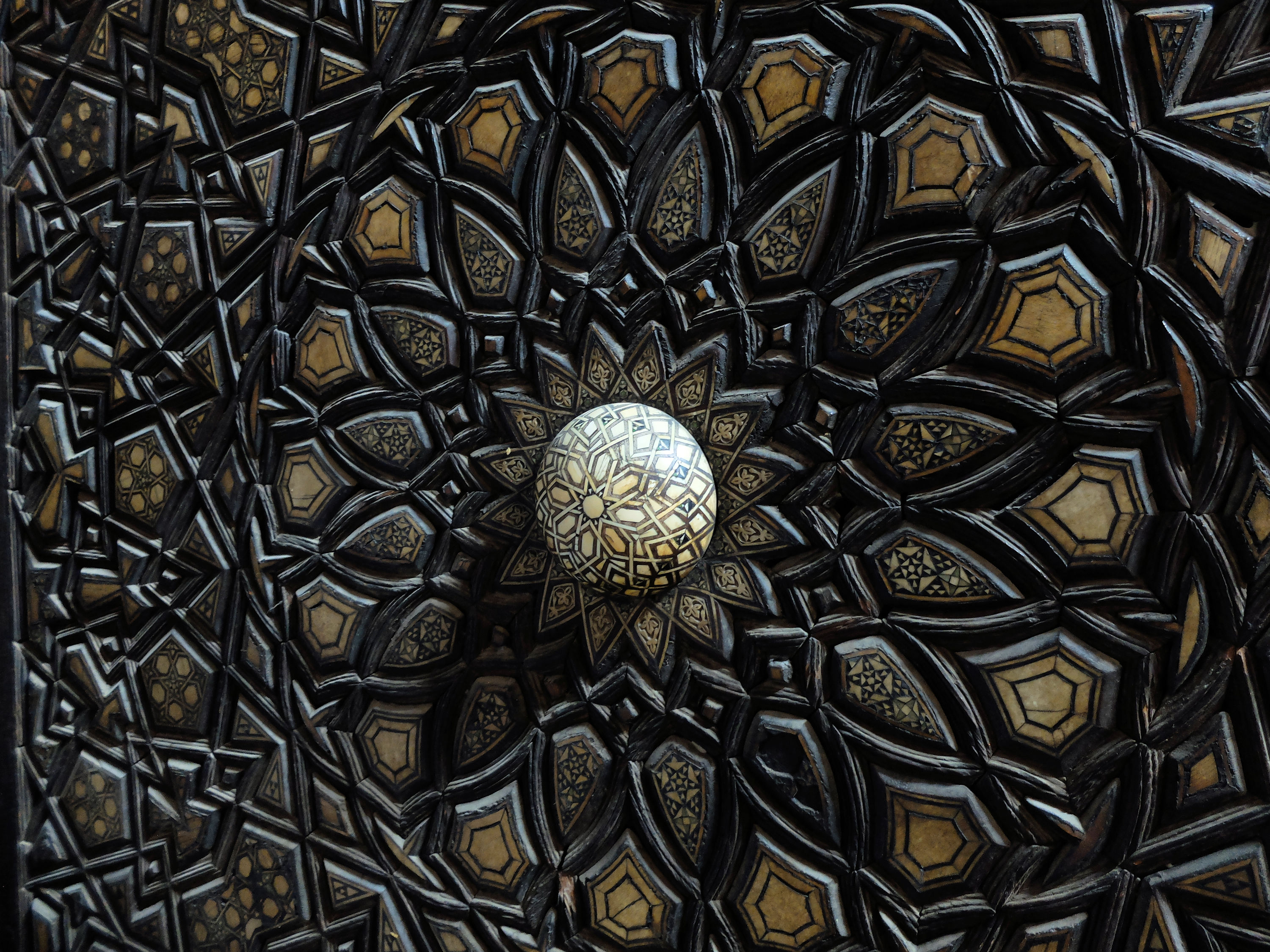
Close-up of the minbar's decorated surface

== Condition ==
The mosque is well-preserved overall; and is in need of restoration. The original kuttab in the northern annex of the mosque is in use as a primary school. At some point in recent years, the elaborate metal knockers of the main doors, which featured carved dragon heads, were stolen. In 2017, Al Wafd newspaper criticized the condition of the mosque as resulting from the negligence on the part of the Ministry of the Antiquity. According to the paper, the main facade was deteriorated and the surrounds filled with garbage.

== See also ==
- Islam in Egypt
- List of madrasas in Egypt
- List of mausoleums in Egypt
- List of mosques in Cairo
- Late medieval domes
