= Egyptian piastre =

Former Egyptian currency

The piastre (Egyptian: ersh, قرش) was the currency of Egypt until 1834. It was subdivided into 40 para, each of 3 akçe.

== History ==
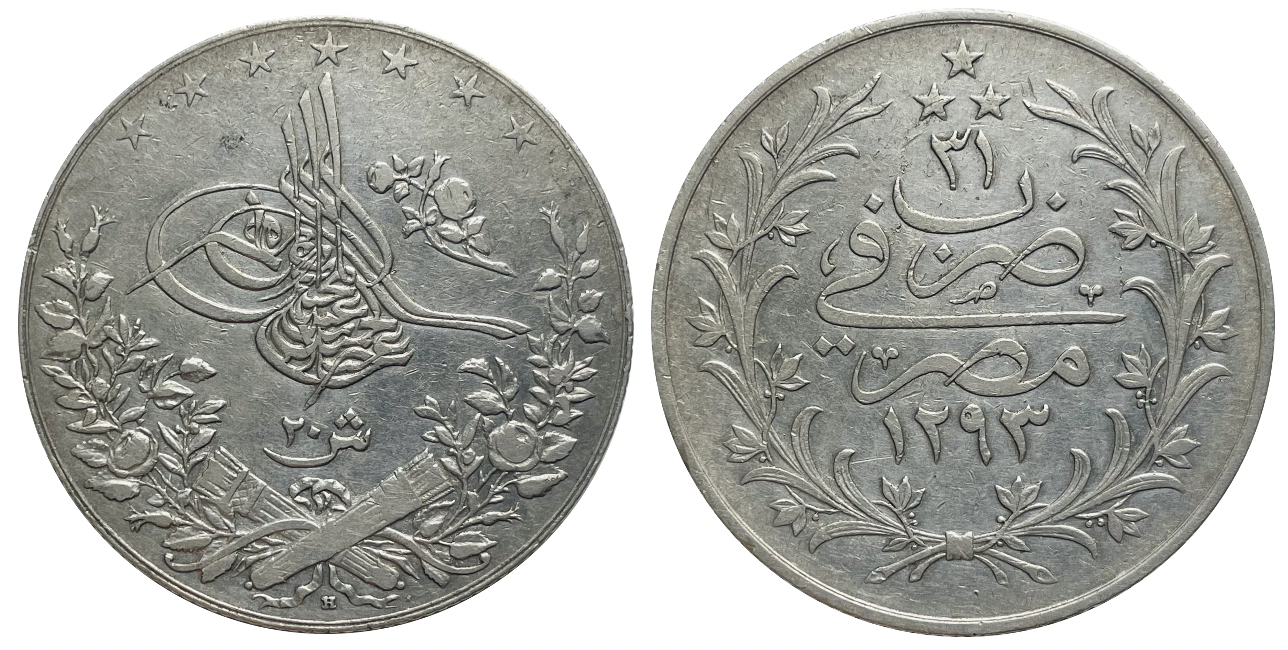
20 qirsh of Abdul Hamid II struck in Egypt (Arabic: مصر, romanized: Mıṣr), issued in 1896, his 20th regnal year

The piastre was based on the Turkish kuruş, introduced while Egypt was part of the Ottoman Empire. As in Turkey, debasement lead to the piastre falling significantly in value.

In 1834, the pound, or gineih (Arabic), was introduced as the chief unit of currency, worth 100 piastre. The piastre continues in use to the present day as a subdivision of the pound. The piastre continued to circulate, with the piastre subdivided into 40 para. In 1885, the para ceased to be issued, and the piastre was divided into tenths (عشر القرش 'oshr el-qirsh). These tenths were renamed milliemes (malleem) in 1916.

== Coins ==
In the early 19th century, billon coins in denominations of 1 akçe, 1, 5, 10 and 20 para, and 1 qirsh were in circulation, along with gold coins denominated as ¼, ½, 1, 2 and 3 mahbub.

== See also ==
- Egyptian pound
