= Ottoman architecture in Egypt =

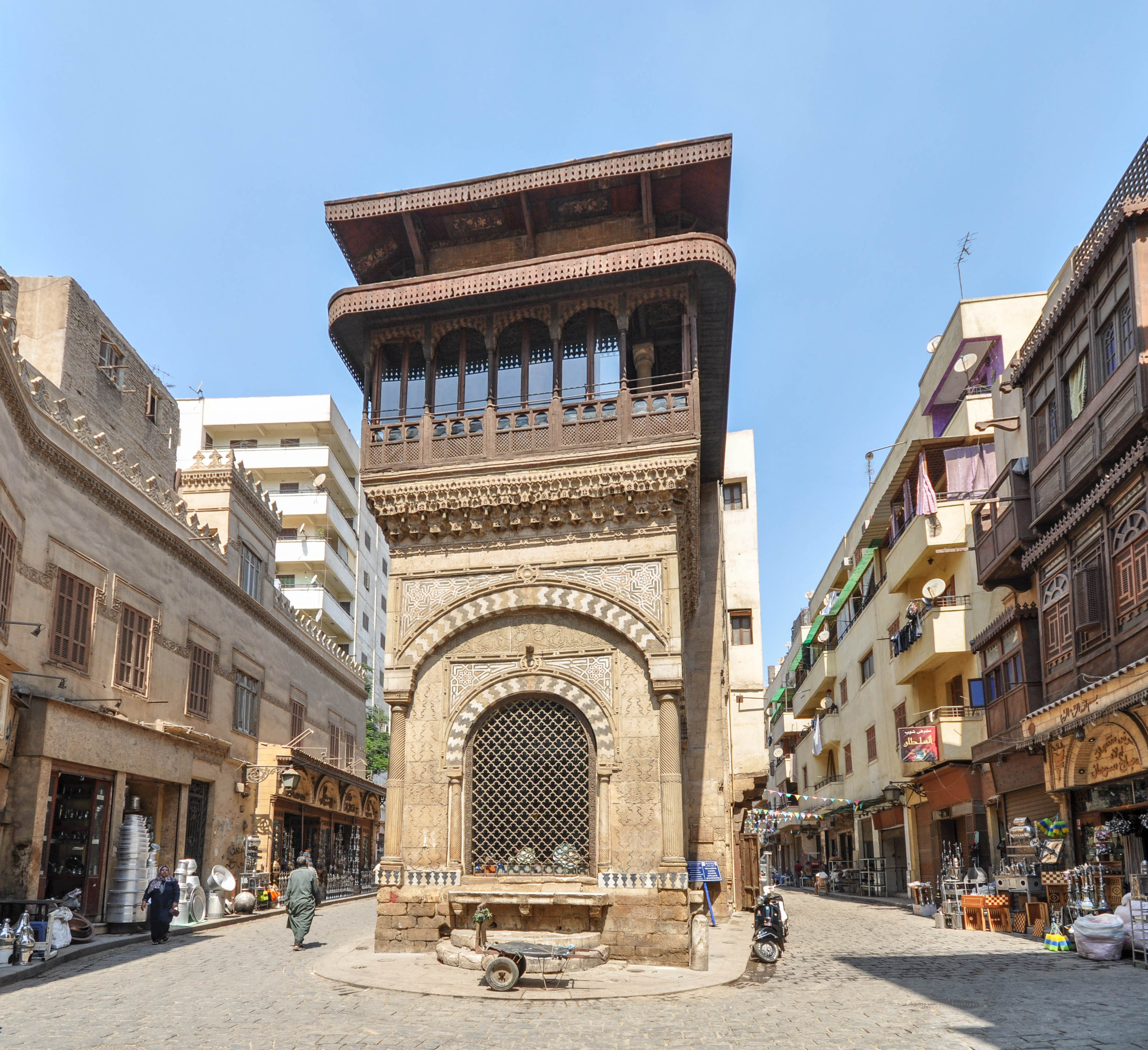
The Sabil-Kuttab of Abd al-Rahman Katkhuda in Cairo (1744)

Ottoman architecture in Egypt, during the period after the Ottoman conquest in 1517, continued the traditions of earlier Mamluk architecture but was influenced by the architecture of the Ottoman Empire. Important new features introduced into local architecture included the pencil-style Ottoman minaret, central-domed mosques, new tile decoration and other characteristics of Ottoman architecture. Architectural patronage was reduced in scale compared to previous periods, as Egypt became an Ottoman province instead of the center of an empire. One of the most common types of building erected in Cairo during this period is the sabil-kuttab (a combination of sabil and kuttab).

== Background: Ottoman provincial architecture ==
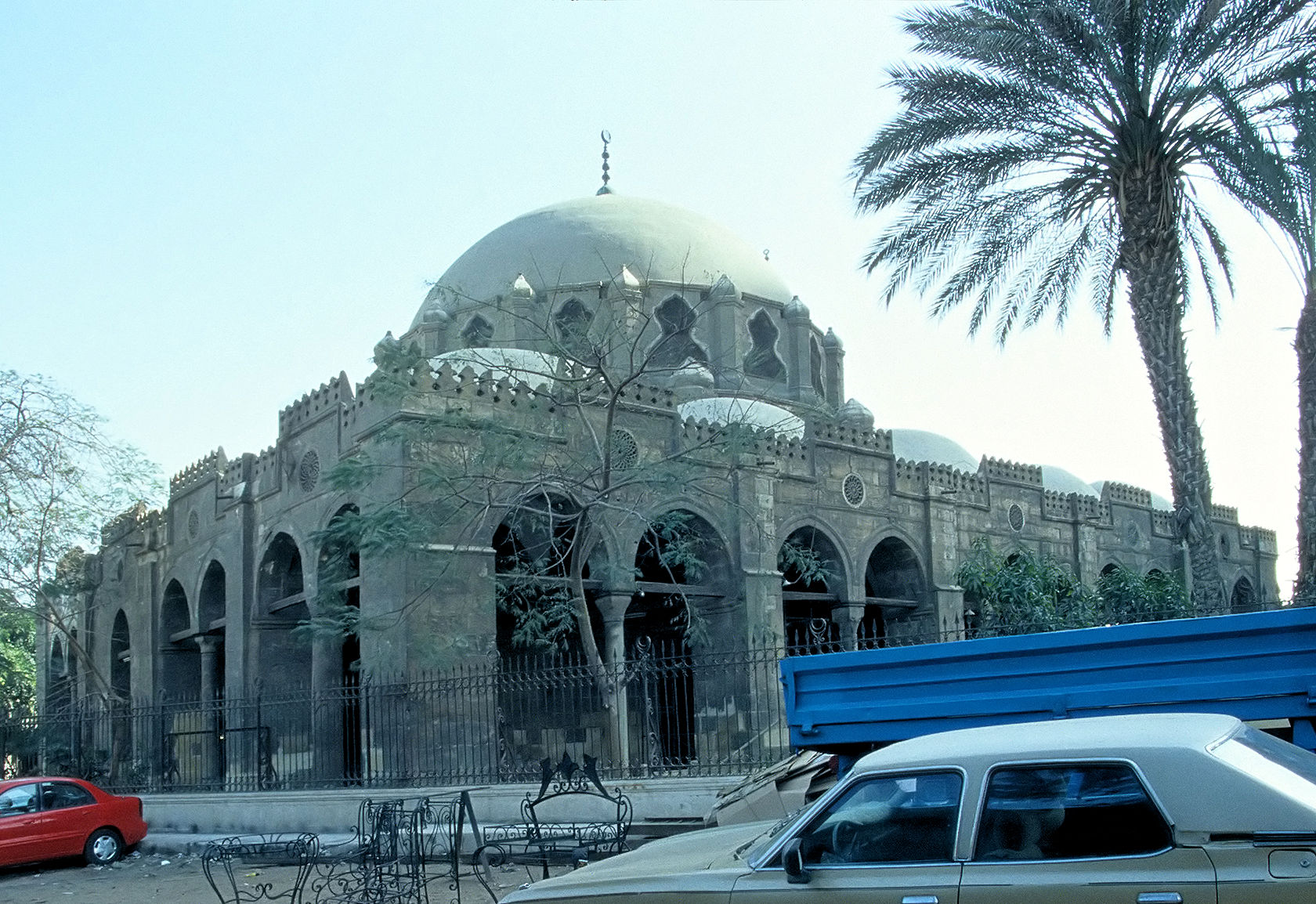
Sinan Pasha Mosque in Cairo (1571), which exemplifies the blend of Mamluk and Ottoman styles

At the apogee of the Ottoman Empire in the 16th century its state bureaucracy, whose foundations were laid in Istanbul by Mehmet II, became increasingly elaborate and the profession of the architect became further institutionalized. Many of the architects and administrators were recruited from the European population of the empire through the devshirme system. The Ottoman administration included a "palace department of buildings" (khāṣṣa mi'mārları), which grew from 13 architects in 1525 to 39 architects by 1604. The central state commissioned and planned building projects across its vast territory, a practice that also helped to establish Ottoman sovereignty in these provinces through the construction of monuments in a visibly Ottoman style. Architects in the capital were able to draw plans and delegate them to other architects who carried them out locally, while the imperial administration developed a set of standards for planning and construction and was able to coordinate the procurement and transportation of the necessary materials. Often plans, but no elevations or craftsmen, were sent to the provinces. This can be seen for instance in the combination of an Ottoman plan with a Cairene elevation in the Sinan Pasha Mosque in Bulaq, Cairo.

In the provinces of the empire that were more distant from the imperial capital, the encounter between Ottoman influence and local traditions had a variety of outcomes. In the Middle East and North Africa, where Arabic and Islamic culture was long-established, Ottoman governors and other officials sent from the capital often respected or adapted to local culture, while existing Islamic architectural styles remained dominant or were blended with elements of Ottoman architecture. In Egypt and the Levant, Mamluk architecture had been the prevailing architectural tradition and it remained in fashion even after the Mamluk Empire was defeated by the Ottomans.

== Architecture in the 16th–18th centuries ==
=== General ===
In 1517 the Ottoman conquest of Egypt formally brought Mamluk rule to an end, although Mamluks themselves continued to play a prominent role in local politics. In architecture, there was significant continuity with existing Mamluk architectural style, but new Ottoman features and building types were introduced. For example, most Egyptian mosques of the period consistently adopt the pointed Ottoman style of minaret rather than the more ornate traditional Mamluk-style minaret, which is one of the features that visually denoted Ottoman hegemony in the urban landscape. In the late Mamluk period stone domes had become almost exclusively associated with mausoleums, but under Ottoman influence they were used to roof the prayer halls of mosques. The scale of architectural patronage also declined in comparison with previous periods.

The sabil-kuttab (Arabic: سبيل وكتاب), a combination of a sabil (water-dispensing kiosk) on the ground floor and a primary school (kuttab or maktab) above it, was a typical building type of the architecture built by the Ottomans in Cairo. These structures had existed in the late Mamluk period but they proliferated under the Ottomans and numerous surviving examples date from the 18th century. One of the best-known examples is the Sabil-Kuttab of Abd ar-Rahman Katkhuda (1744) on al-Mu'izz street.

Tile decoration, which was not characteristic of earlier Mamluk architecture, was a recurrent addition to new and old buildings during the Ottoman period. In addition to Ottoman tiles of various styles, multiple examples of imported Delft tiles are also found.

=== 16th and 17th centuries ===
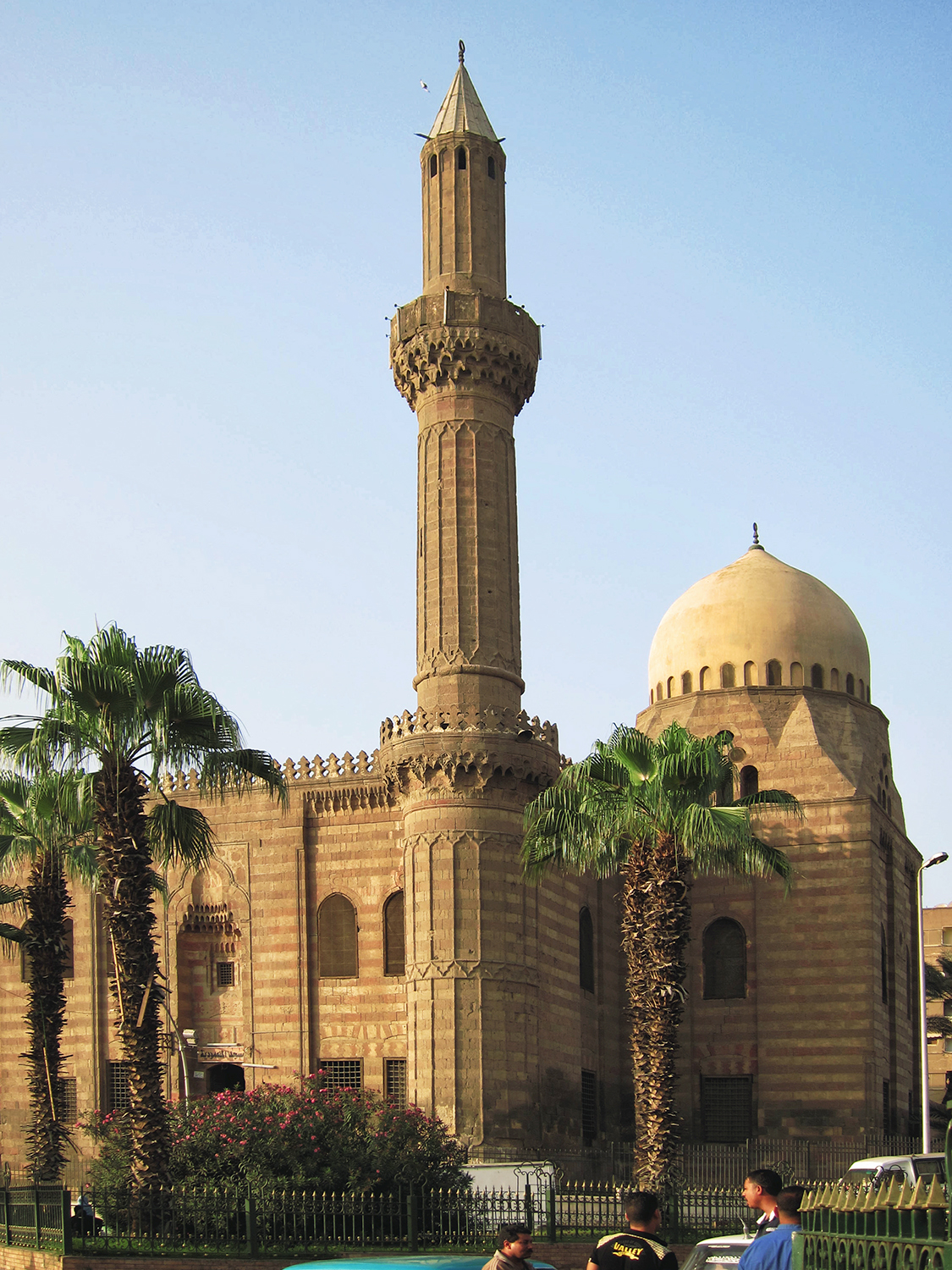
Mosque of Mahmud Pasha in Cairo (1568), largely Mamluk in style but with an Ottoman-type minaret

The funerary mosque of Amir Khayrbak in Cairo was completed in 1521 and was thus the first monument of elite patronage completed during the Ottoman period, but it was begun in 1502 (prior to the Ottoman conquest) and its style is entirely Mamluk. The later funerary mosque of Mahmud Pasha (1568), near the 14th-century Mosque-Madrasa of Sultan Hasan, is still almost entirely Mamluk in design, except for its Ottoman-inspired minaret. The mosque's site was chosen to allow for the erection of a freestanding building, unencumbered by surrounding structures, and this was a trend that distinguished Ottoman-period mosques in Cairo from those of the Mamluk period, which were weaved more closely into the existing urban fabric. Even later, the Mosque of al-Burdayni in Cairo (1616–1629), commissioned by a local Egyptian shaykh, appears to consciously imitate the old Mamluk style instead of the Ottoman style, and contains surprisingly rich interior decoration unlike that of typical Ottoman mosques.

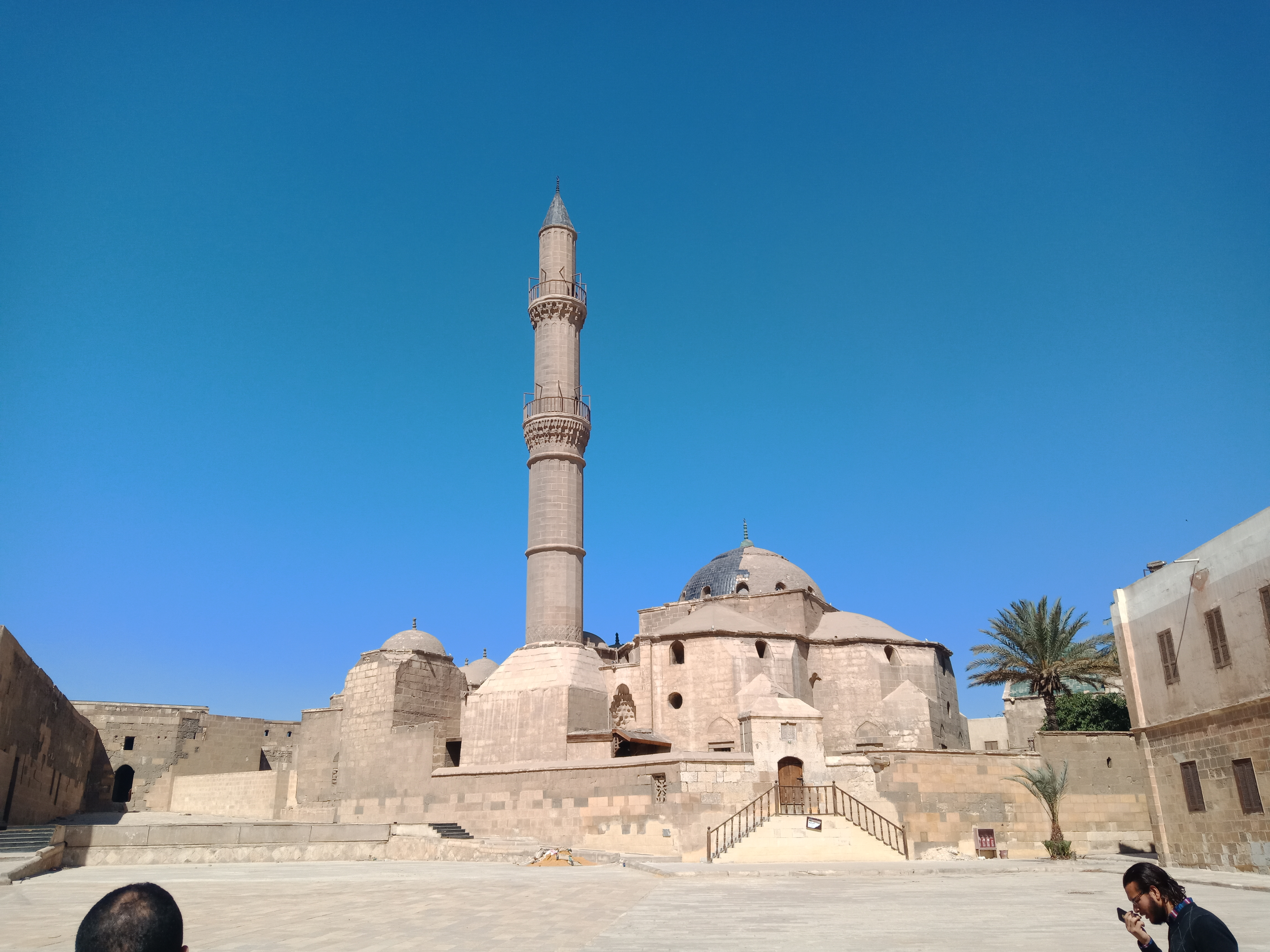
Mosque of Sulayman Pasha in the Citadel of Cairo (1528), closer in style to Classical Ottoman architecture

In Cairo, the closest representative of classical 16th-century Ottoman mosques is the Mosque of Suleyman Pasha (1528), built inside the Cairo Citadel. The roofing of the prayer hall by a central dome and three semi-domes, the pencil-shaped minaret, and the open courtyard surrounded by a domed portico are all classical Ottoman features. A few of its details, however, such as the marble paneling decoration of the interior, draw on the local Mamluk-Cairene style. The Sinan Pasha Mosque (1571) in the Bulaq neighbourhood of Cairo is somewhat less Ottoman in character and more heavily influenced by local traditions, but it is also one of the most successful mosques of this period blending these two traditions. It consists of a large single-domed prayer hall surrounded by a domed portico on three sides, both typical Ottoman features. The multi-lobed pendentives of the dome, the decoration of the mihrab, and the shape of the windows are all in local styles. The dome, 15 metres (49 ft) in diameter, is the largest stone dome in Cairo. The Mosque of Malika Safiyya (1610) was probably built by local architects commissioned to design an Istanbul-style mosque. The feature most reminiscent of Istanbul is the square courtyard that precedes the prayer hall, while the prayer hall has a central dome surrounded by smaller domes.

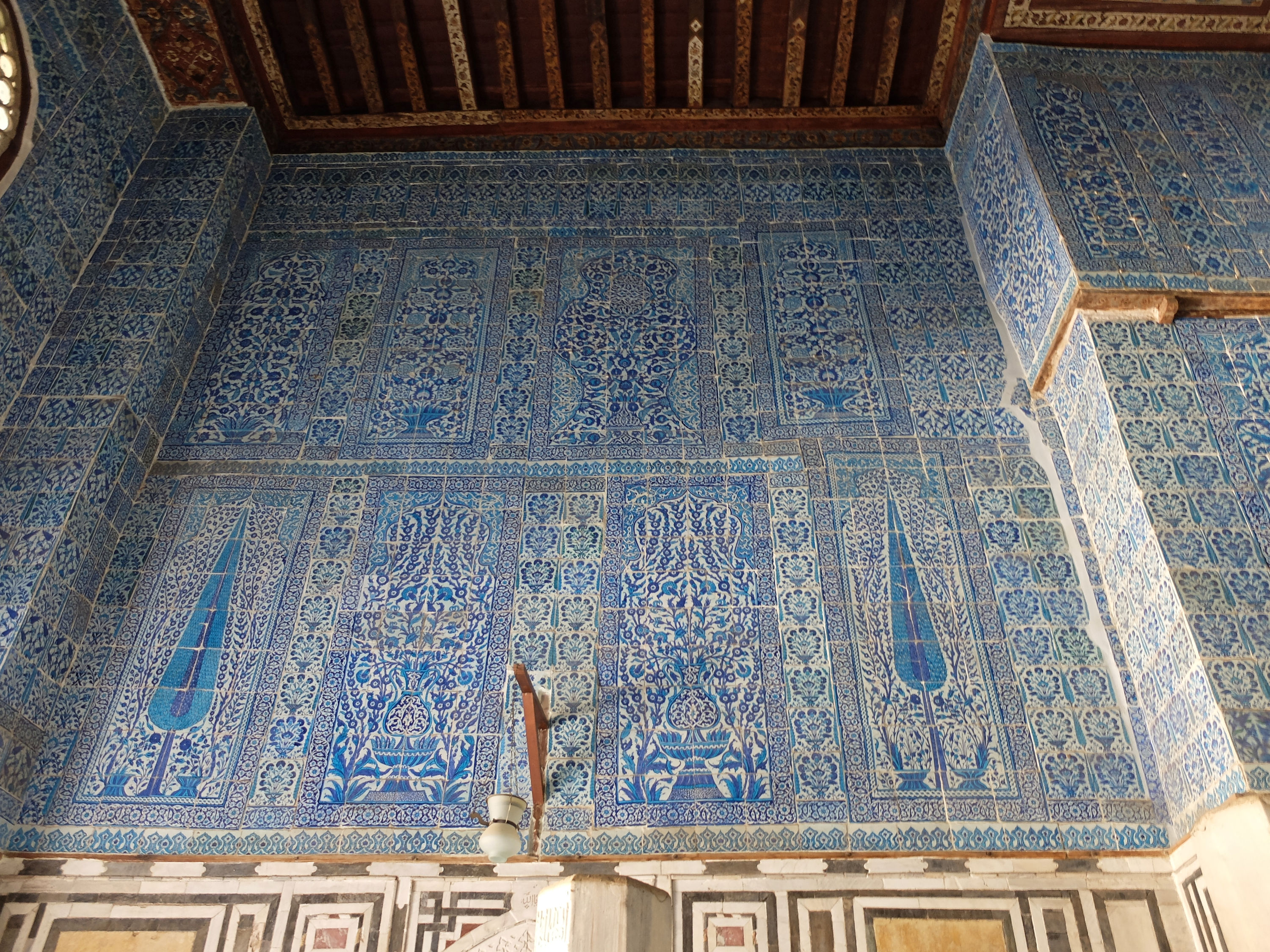
Iznik tiles in the "Blue Mosque" of Cairo, a Mamluk building renovated in the 17th century by an Ottoman janissary

As the construction of new monumental funerary complexes declined in Cairo during the Ottoman period, local Ottomans were instead buried in older mausoleums from earlier periods. A well known example is the 14th-century Aqsunqur Mosque (now also known as the "Blue Mosque"), which was renovated in 1652 by Ibrahim Agha, a local Janissary commander. The renovation added extensive Ottoman Iznik tile decoration on the qibla wall and in the attached tomb he built for himself. Another example of a Mamluk building repurposed is the 14th-century Madrasa of Amir Sunqur Sa'di, which an Ottoman pasha gifted in 1607 to the Mevlevis, a Sufi order popular in the Ottoman Empire. A Sufi ceremonial hall, still extant today, was later built over the remains of the madrasa's courtyard in the 19th century.

=== 18th century ===
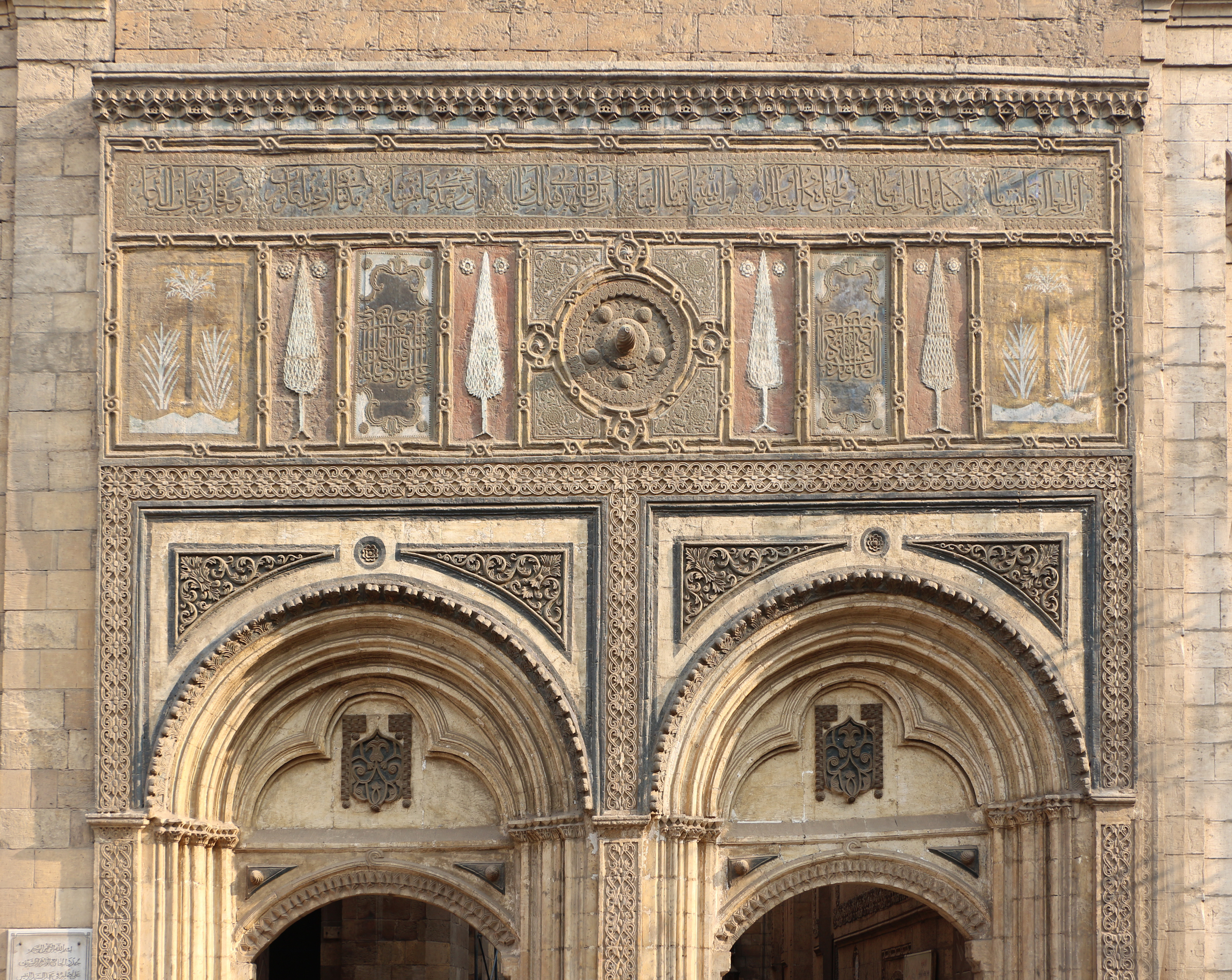
Details of the Gate of the Barbers (c. 1753) at al-Azhar Mosque, part of the mosque's expansion by Abd ar-Rahman Katkhuda

In the 18th century the power of the local Janissaries and allied urban notables increased. Buildings sponsored by local elites were generally still built in an Ottoman-Mamluk hybrid style, such as the Sabil-kuttab of Abd ar-Rahman Katkhuda (mentioned above). While Mamluk-era configurations remained predominant, Ottoman decoration was applied in highly visible ways in some local monuments, most notably in the use of Ottoman blue and white tiles, including re-used 16th-century Iznik tiles imported from Istanbul.

Abd al-Rahman Katkhuda, a Mamluk who occupied multiple high offices over several decades, was the greatest patron of architecture in the 18th century, sponsoring the construction or restoration of 33 monuments around Cairo. In addition to his aforementioned sabil-kuttab on al-Mu'izz street and other projects, he sponsored a major expansion of al-Azhar Mosque which was completed circa 1753. Among the structures he added to the mosque is its present-day western gate, the Gate of the Barbers (Bab al-Muzayyinin). His constructions are marked by ornate stonework that attest to a revival of the decorative style of Sultan Qaytbay's reign in the late 15th century.

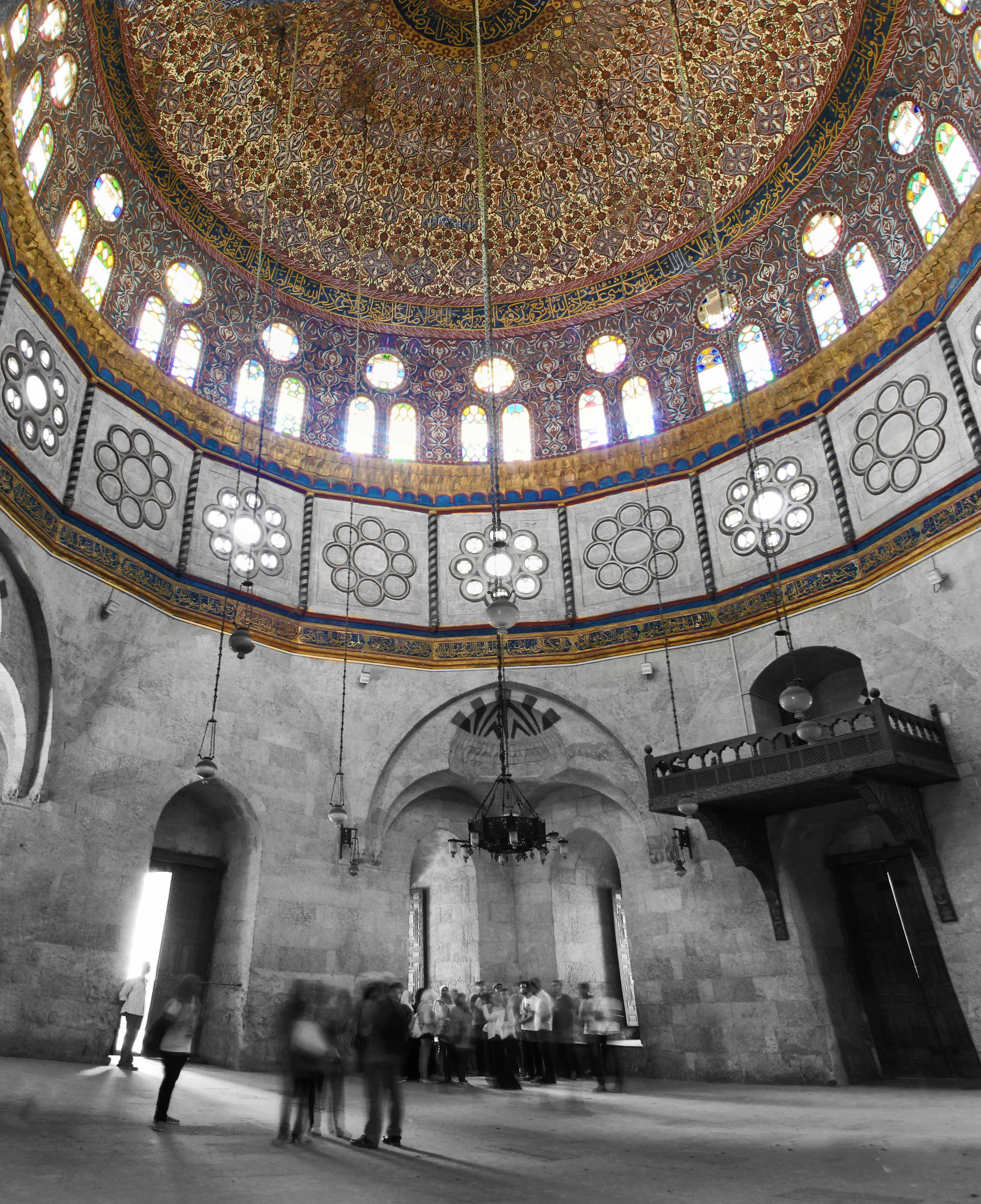
Interior of the Mosque of Abu al-Dhahab in Cairo (c. 1774)

One of the notable mosques from this period is the Mosque of Abu al-Dhahab (c. 1774), erected next to al-Azhar Mosque. It is similar to the older Sinan Pasha Mosque in form and mixes elements inspired by various sources. The mosque is surrounded by an outer enclosing wall with a Mamluk-style façade and its minaret imitates the original appearance of the minaret of the al-Ghuri Mosque-Madrasa nearby. The interior of the mosque is also paneled with tiles of both Turkish and Tunisian origin.

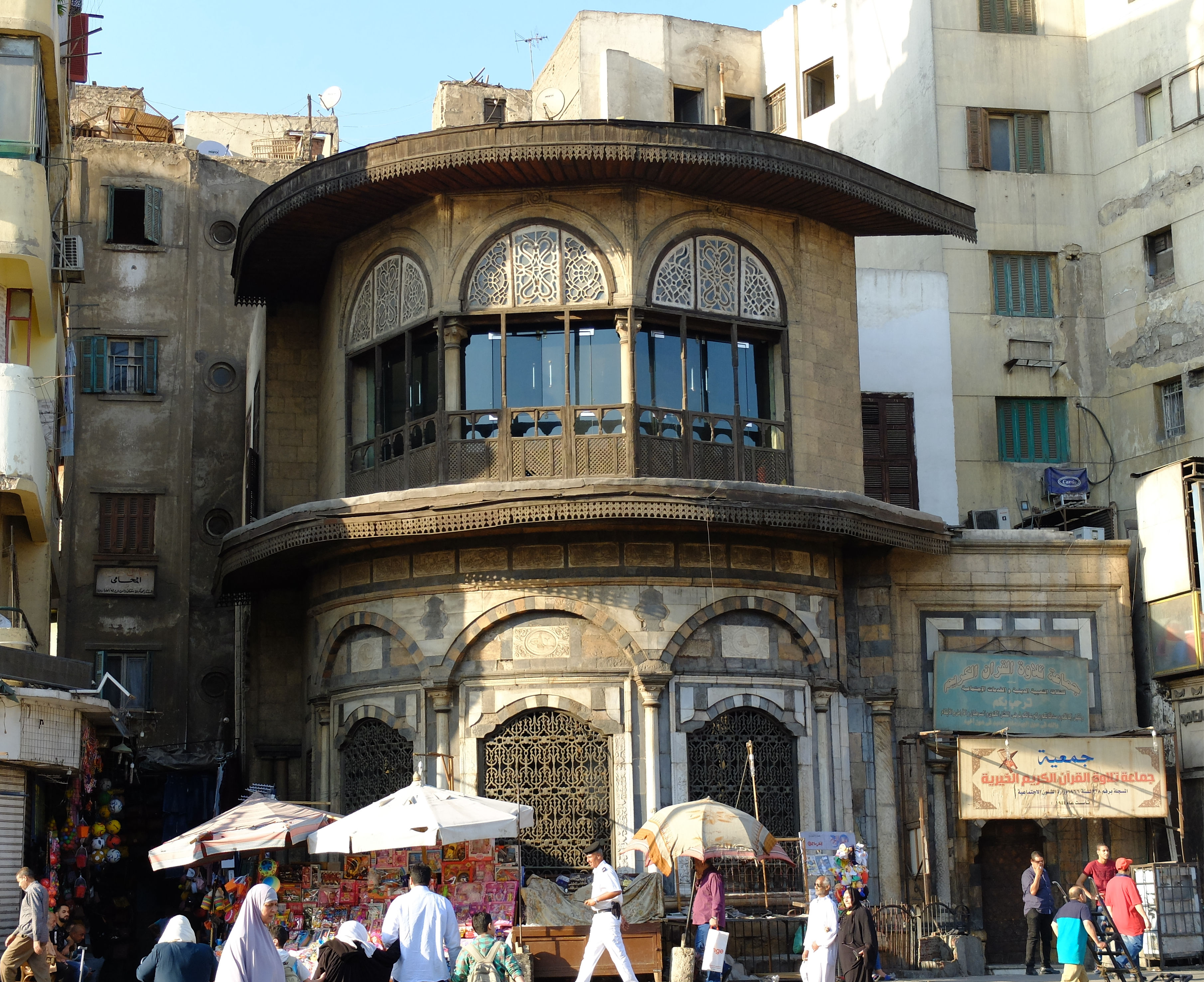
Sabil-kuttab of Mustafa III (1758–1760), the first monument in Cairo to incorporate some elements of the Ottoman Baroque style

Although local patrons dominated, a few rare monuments sponsored by Ottoman sultans were also built in Cairo in the mid-18th century, demonstrating a certain level of renewed imperial interest in the city. The Takiyya Mahmudiyya, sponsored by Mahmud I and dated to 1750, was the first Ottoman complex in Cairo to be founded by a sultan, over two and a half centuries after the conquest of the city. It consists of a madrasa and a sabil-kuttab. The style and decoration of the complex is a fusion of Ottoman and local Cairene (Mamluk) styles, but it does not include any elements of the new Ottoman Baroque style Mahmud I was employing in Istanbul. The most influential innovation of Mahmud I's complex was the curved façade of its sabil-kuttab, a local interpretation of the curved sabil facades in Istanbul, which was repeated in subsequent sabil-kuttab designs in Cairo. A slightly later imperial foundation, the Sabil-kuttab of Mustafa III in Cairo (located across from the Mosque of Sayyida Zeinab) in 1758–1760, still demonstrates local Cairene influences but this time it incorporates some new Ottoman Baroque details for the first time. Another sabil-kuttab founded by Mustafa III near the Mosque of Sayyida Nafisa in 1756–1757 has not been preserved.

Outside Cairo, the town of Rashid (Rosetta) is known today for its houses and mosques preserved from the Ottoman period. The town was an important center of maritime trade in Ottoman Egypt from the 16th to 18th centuries. At least two important mosques in the city date from the 18th century: the Mosque of Salah Agha Duqmaqsis (1702) and the Mosque of Muhammad al-'Abbasi (1773, but probably restored in 1809). The Mosque of Duqmaqsis is notable as the only "raised" mosque in the city, built above a substructure of vaulted storerooms and shops. Among its decoration is a variety of tiles, including contemporary Tunisian tiles, reused 16th-century Iznik tiles, and Damascus-produced imitations of Iznik tiles.

== Architecture in the 19th century ==
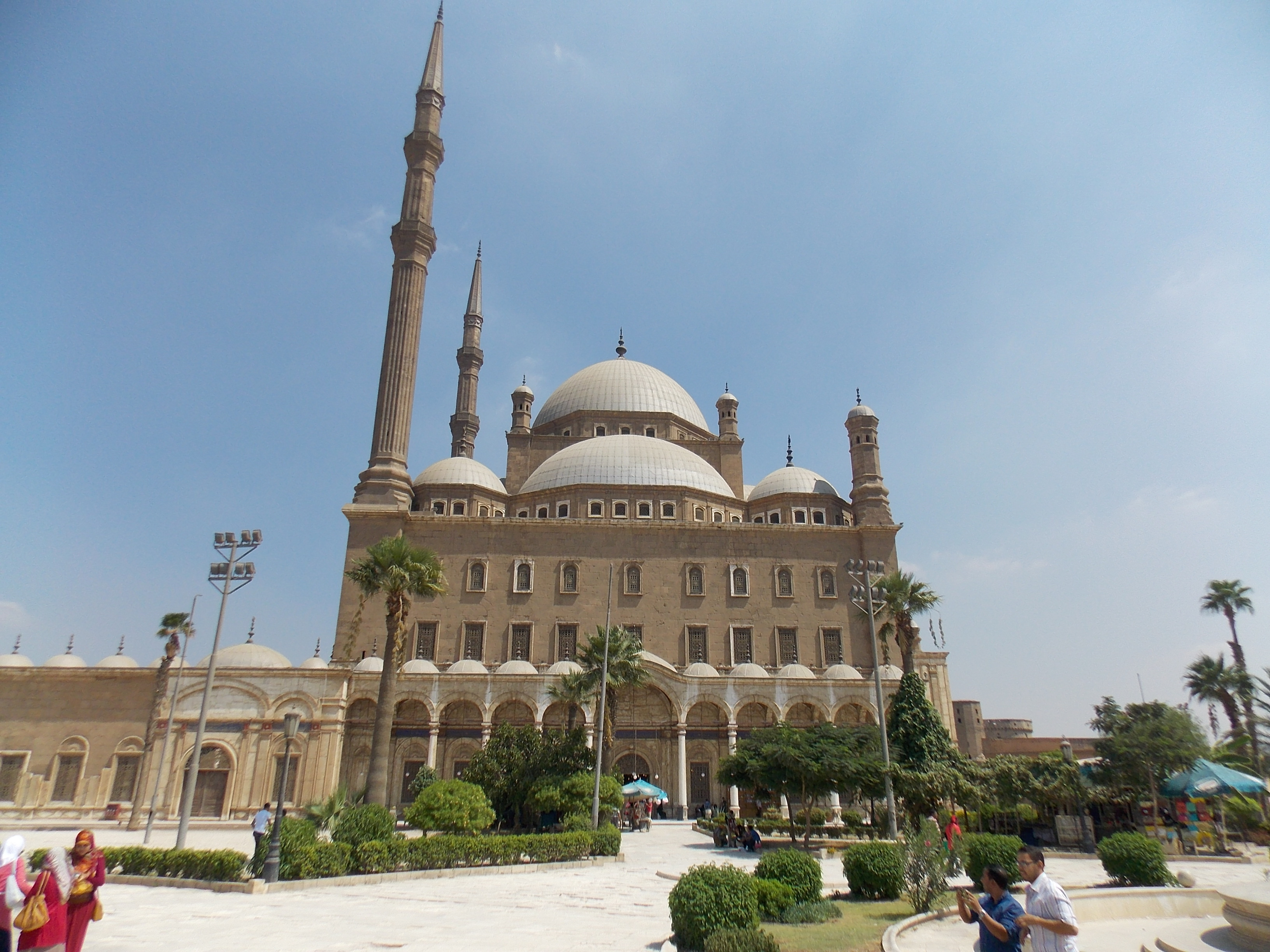
Mosque of Muhammad Ali in the Citadel of Cairo, completed in 1848

In the 19th century, under the de facto independent rule of Muhammad Ali and his successors, Ottoman Baroque and contemporary late Ottoman Westernizing decoration was conspicuously employed in new buildings, including the Mosque of Muhammad Ali, built between 1830 and 1848 in the Citadel. Muhammad Ali's mosque is entirely Ottoman in form and adopts the same layout as the Şehzade Mosque and Sultan Ahmed Mosque in Istanbul, referencing the classical architecture of the Ottoman Empire at its apogee. This choice of model expressed a pan-Islamic affiliation beyond Egypt. The mosque's decoration, however, eschews any Mamluk influences or any traditional Islamic ornamentation in favour of European influences instead, although Qur'anic inscriptions and references are still present. These deliberate design choices were a radical break from the architectural traditions of Cairo and likely symbolized Muhammad Ali's own efforts to forge a new order in Egypt. Having been appointed Ottoman governor in 1805 and eliminated the remaining Mamluks in 1811, he undertook a program of modernization while increasing Egypt's independence from Istanbul. The new architectural vocabulary likely symbolized these changes, and the mosque's size and prominent position on Cairo's skyline reinforced this statement.

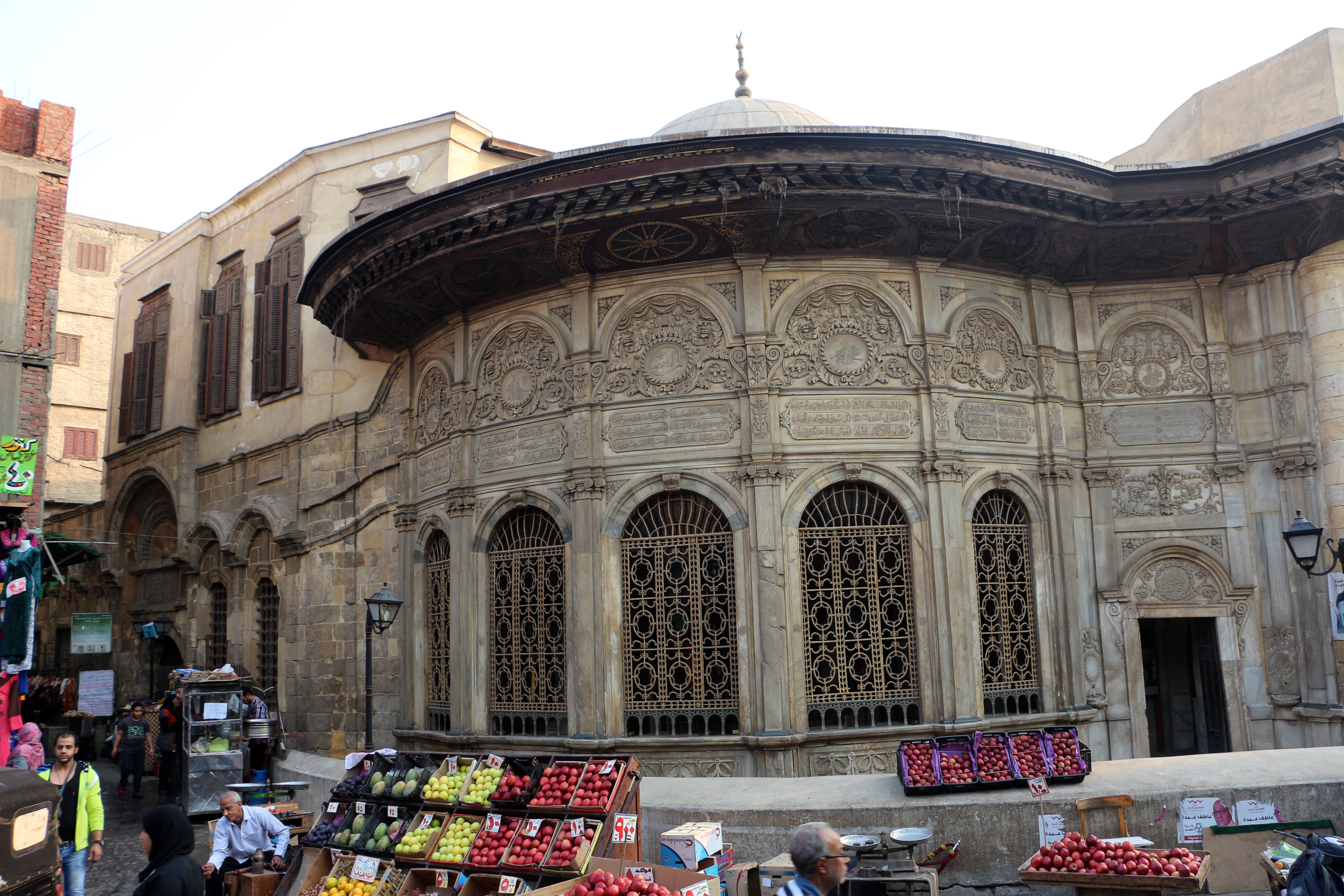
Sabil-kuttab commissioned by Muhammad Ali in honour of his son, Tusun Pasha, in Cairo (1820)

The new style of this period also appears in multiple sabil-kuttabs built throughout the city, which feature curved street facades carved with new leaf, garland, and sunburst motifs. Examples include the Sabil of Tusun Pasha (1820; also known as the Sabil of Muhammad Ali Pasha), the Sabil of Isma'il Pasha (1828), and Sabil of Umm Abbas. The larger Sabil and Mosque complex of Sulayman Agha al-Silahdar (1839) is also an example. In the Cairo Citadel, Muhammad Ali also constructed several new palaces, some of which survive today and have been repurposed as museums, including the Gawhara Palace (1814) and the Harim Palace (1827; now the Egyptian National Military Museum). These palaces are a mix of Ottoman Baroque and European styles, decorated with gilding, molded motifs, painted ceilings, and frescoes.

== See also ==
- Architecture of Egypt
- Residential architecture in Historic Cairo
