= Mosque of Abu al-Dhahab =

Mosque in Cairo, Egypt

- مسجد أبو الذهب
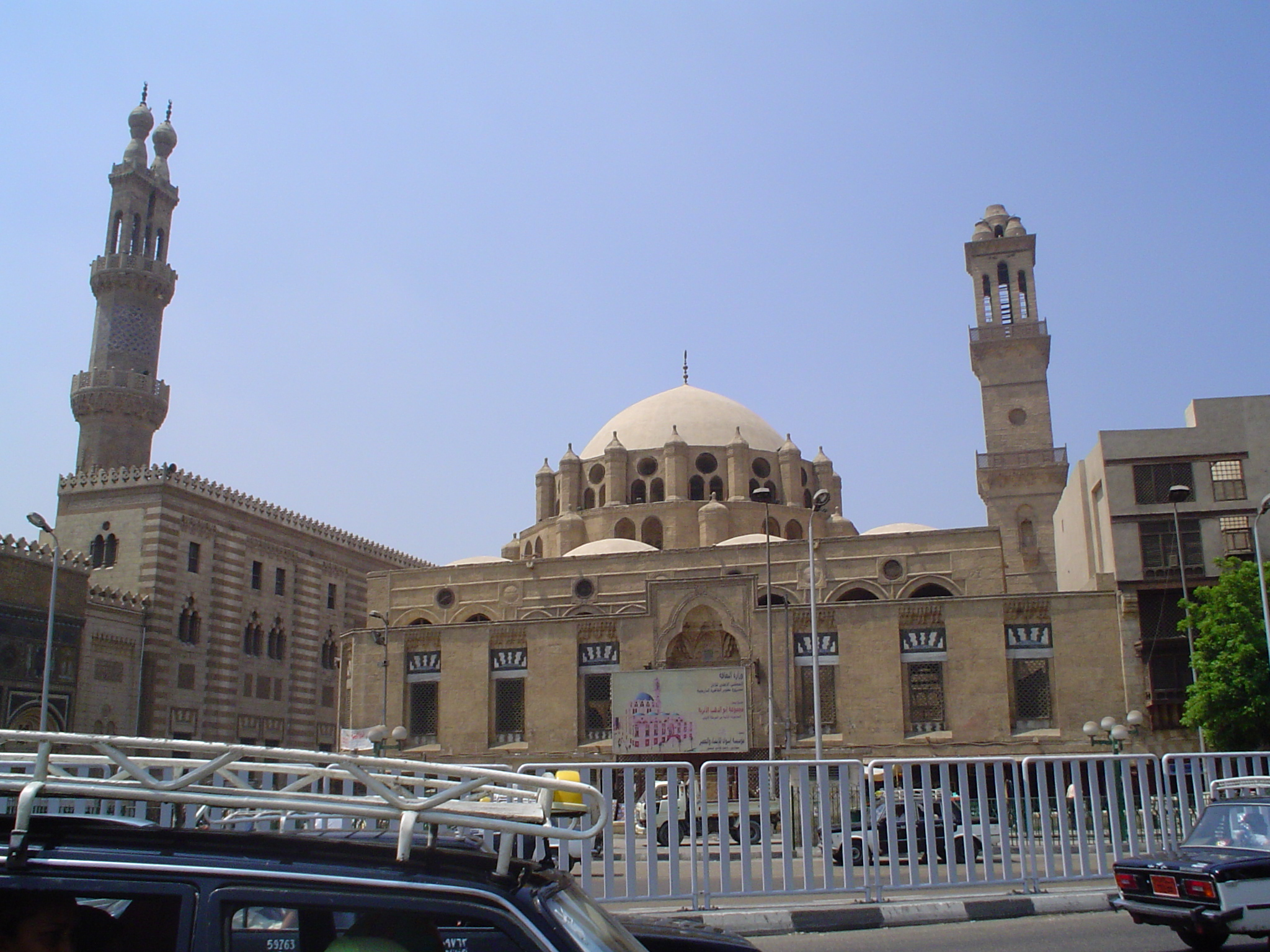

Religion
- Affiliation: Sunni Islam
- Ecclesiastical or organisational status: Mosque
- Status: Active

Location
- Location: Islamic Cairo
- Country: Egypt
- Interactive map of Mosque of Abu al-Dhahab
- Coordinates: 30°02′46″N 31°15′42″E

Architecture
- Type: Mosque
- Style: Egyptian-Ottoman
- Completed: 1774 CE

Specifications
- Dome: 1
- Minaret: 1

The Mosque of Abu al-Dhahab (Arabic: مسجد أبو الذهب) is a mosque located in Islamic Cairo, Egypt, adjacent to the Al-Azhar Mosque. It is a notable example of Egyptian-Ottoman architecture.

== History ==
The mosque was completed in 1774 CE, commissioned by Muhammad Bey Abu al-Dhahab, an Egyptian bey and a mamluk of 'Ali Bey al-Kabir who acted as the main ruler of Ottoman Egypt between 1772 and 1775. Although only the main mosque structure remains today, the mosque was part of a larger religious-charitable complex that included a madrasa, a library, a takiya (a khanqah or Sufi complex), a sabil (water dispensary), a hod (water trough), and latrines, making it the last major architectural complex of this kind built by the mamluk beys of Egypt. The waqf of the mosque included significant funds earmarked for teaching.

== Architecture ==
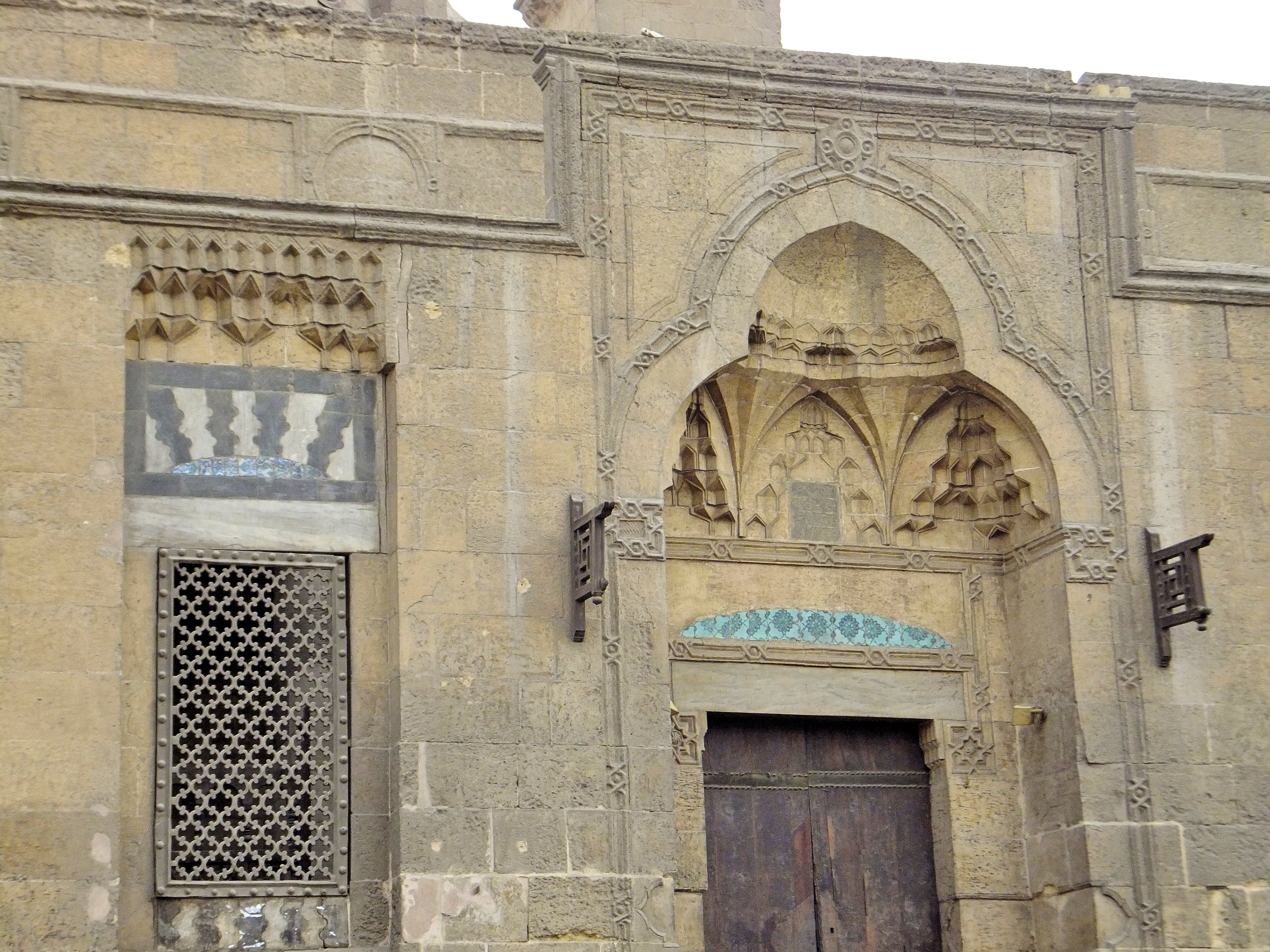
Decoration around the windows and entrance portal of the outer façade

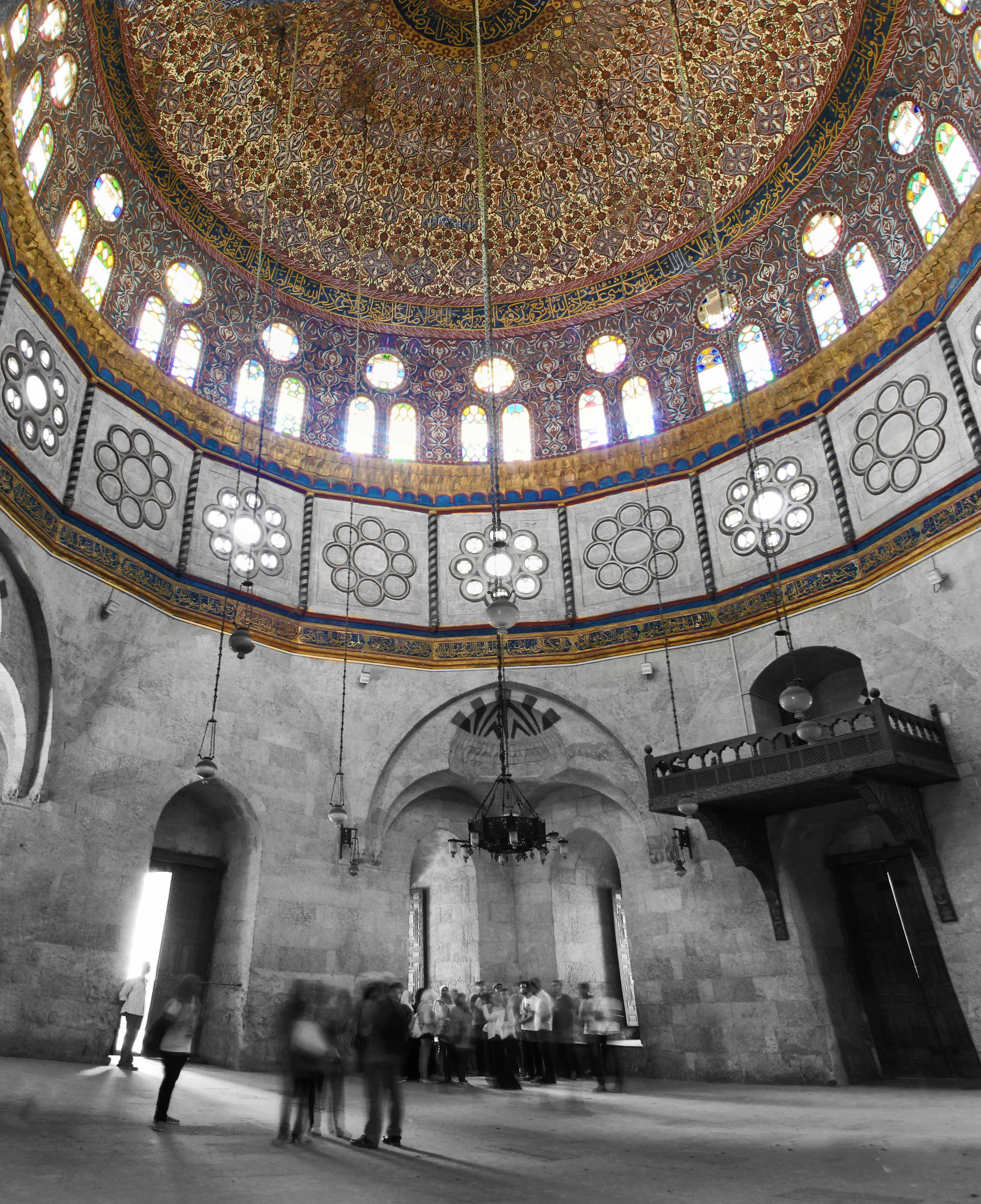
The interior of the mosque

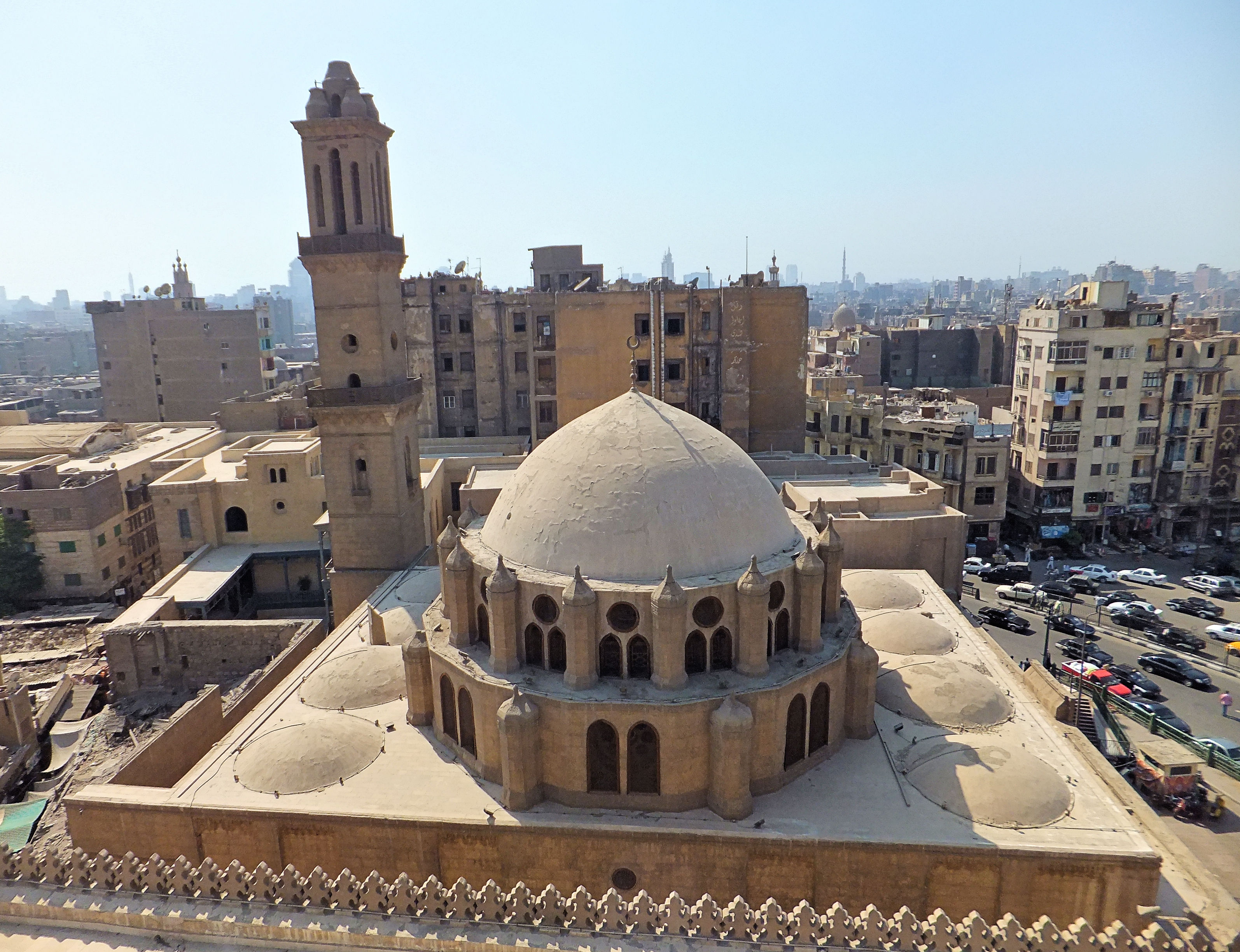
View of the mosque from above (from the east, behind its qibla wall)

The mosque is in a prominent location next to Al-Azhar Mosque, in the heart of Medieval Cairo. Although it has many Mamluk influences, it is architecturally very similar to the earlier Mosque of Sinan Pasha and is a notable example of local Ottoman architecture in the city.

The layout of the mosque is reminiscent of other Ottoman mosques, consisting of a rectangular prayer hall covered by a large dome, surrounded on three sides (all sides except the eastern qibla side) by an exterior portico covered by smaller domes. The portico, however, is preceded by an outer wall façade, shorter than the main building behind it, which demonstrates a more explicitly Mamluk style and has an ornate entrance portal. This façade features muqarnas decoration above its windows and in its portal, as well as ablaq paneling above the windows. The triangular arrangement of windows in the drum of the main dome of the mosque is also a Mamluk feature. The form of the mosque's minaret appears to have been inspired by the original minaret of the nearby al-Ghuri complex (from the early 16th century) which had a quadruple lantern summit. The mosque was also built above a ground-level row of shops which provided it with an additional source of revenues (a feature shared with other raised or "hanging" mosques in Cairo's history). The outer façade wall outside the portico also forms an additional enclosure around the mosque which is angled at a slightly different orientation than the mosque itself because it was aligned with the original street.

The interior of the mosque is accessed via three entrances from the portico. Inside, the large dome has trilobed squinches at its corners (similar to the Qubbat al-Fadawiya in the Abbasiya neighbourhood) and is painted with Ottoman-style arabesques and motifs. Its drum is pierced by two tiers of windows, with the lower windows each consisting of eight small round windows around a larger round window, while the upper ones have a more traditional Mamluk arrangement of two arched windows topped by a round one. The mihrab of the mosque has Mamluk-style decoration with inlaid mother-of-pearl and marble. On the wall opposite the mihrab is a wooden dikka platform.

In the northeast corner of the mosque's portico, under one of the smaller domes, is the tomb of Abu al-Dhahab himself (who died in 1775) and of his sister Zulaykha, sheltered by a bronze grille and decorated with a patchwork of tiles from various periods and regions including Iznik tiles (from Iznik in present-day Turkey), tiles from Istanbul, locally made tiles, and Qallalin tiles from Tunisia. On the south side of the mosque are the remains of a two-story structure which served as the takiya (Sufi lodge).

== See also ==
- Islam in Egypt
- List of mosques in Egypt
