= Sariyya ibn Zanim =

Companion of the Islamic prophet Muhammad

- سارية بن زنيم
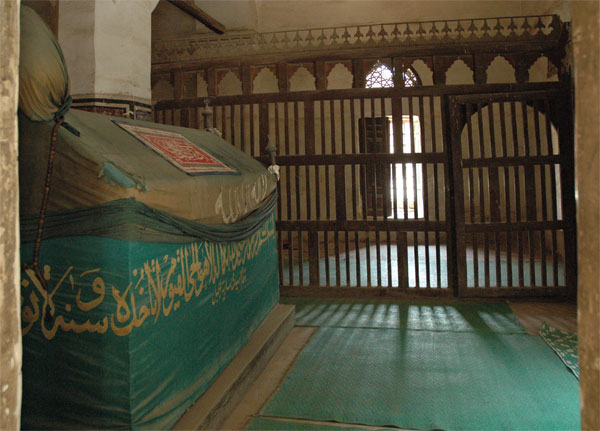
- The tomb of Sariyya in Cairo
- Born: c. End of the 6th century CE; Mecca, now part of Saudi Arabia
- Died: c. 645 CE; Egypt (possibly)
- Monuments: His tomb within the Cairo Citadel in Egypt
- Known for: Being one of Muhammad's companions
- Title: Sariyya al-Jabal

Sariyya ibn Zanim (Arabic: سارية بن زنيم) also known as Sariya al-Jabal was one of the Sahaba, who lived during the 6th–7th centuries CE. He was from the tribe of Kinana and later served as a military commander under the Rashidun caliph Umar ibn al-Khattab after the death of the Islamic prophet Muhammad.

== Biography ==
=== Lineage and name ===
His full name with patronymic, according to historians, is Sariyya ibn Zanim ibn 'Amr ibn Abdullah ibn Jabir ibn Mahmiyah ibn 'Abd ibn Adiyy ibn ad-Da'il ibn Bakr ibn 'Abd Manat ibn Kinana, and from there his lineage is then traced to Adnan. He is also known as Sariya al-Jabal.

=== Before Islam ===
In the pre-Islamic period, Sariyya ibn Zanim was known to be a robber who had the ability to run faster than the average horse.

=== Conversion to Islam ===
Sariyya converted to Islam in the 7th century. According to Ibn Hajar al-Asqalani, Sariyya influenced his nephew to become a convert to Islam, as he was the only one out of the whole tribe of Kinana who had not yet become a Muslim. After the death of the Islamic prophet Muhammad, Sariyya participated in several conquests under the Rashidun Caliphate, and was ordered by Umar ibn al-Khattab to be a military commander for the Islamic conquests of Persia.

== The incident of Sariyya and the mountain ==
According to Islamic tradition, one day while Umar ibn al-Khattab was giving a khutbah in the Prophet's Mosque at Medina, he suddenly blurted out, in a loud voice, "Ya Sariyya! Al-Jabal, al-Jabal! (O Sariyya! The mountain, the mountain!)" Umar's voice reached Sariyya, who was in Persia at the time and commanding Rashidun forces against the Sasanian Empire. When Sariyya and his forces followed Umar's telepathic voice and went to the nearest mountain, they were able to fend off the attacks from the enemy soldiers and defeat them. This incident happened in the 23rd year of the Hijra (and hence is dated to 645 CE).

== Tomb ==
A tomb attributed to Sariyya is located in the Sulayman Pasha Mosque which was established by Hadim Suleiman Pasha in 1528. A model boat hangs from the ceiling of the hallways surrounding the tomb; it is likely intended as a reference to the ancient Egyptian burial customs.

== See also ==
- List of Sahaba
