= Qallalin tiles =

Type of decorative tiles made in Tunisia

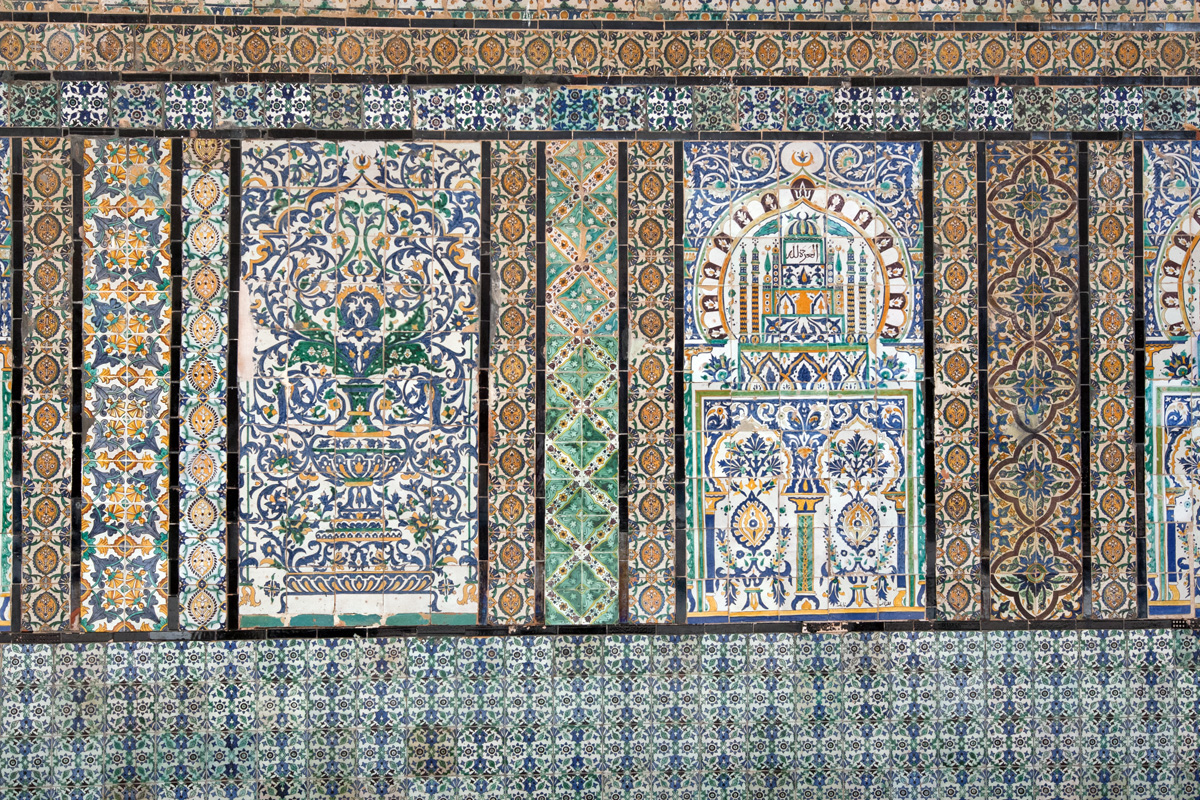
Qallaline tile decoration in the Mosque of the Barber in Kairouan, Tunisia

Qallalin tiles or Qallaline tiles were a type of decorative tile which was characteristic of Tunisian architecture during the 17th and 18th centuries.

== Historical background ==
This type of tile was named for the Qallalin district of Tunis, where they were most commonly produced. Although their production may have started as early as the 16th century, prior to the advent of Ottoman rule, the height of their production and artistic quality were in the 17th and 18th centuries. The Qallalin workshops also produced other pottery objects including vases, jars, pitchers, and lamps. Their quality and production gradually declined in the 19th century.

== Style ==
The tiles are typically underglaze-painted with motifs of vases, plants, and arches. The predominant colours are blue, green, and ochre-like yellow, which distinguishes them from contemporary Ottoman tiles. Good examples of them are found in the Zawiya of Abu al-Balawi or "Mosque of the Barber" in Kairouan, as well as in a number of historic palaces and aristocratic houses in Tunis.

== Distribution ==
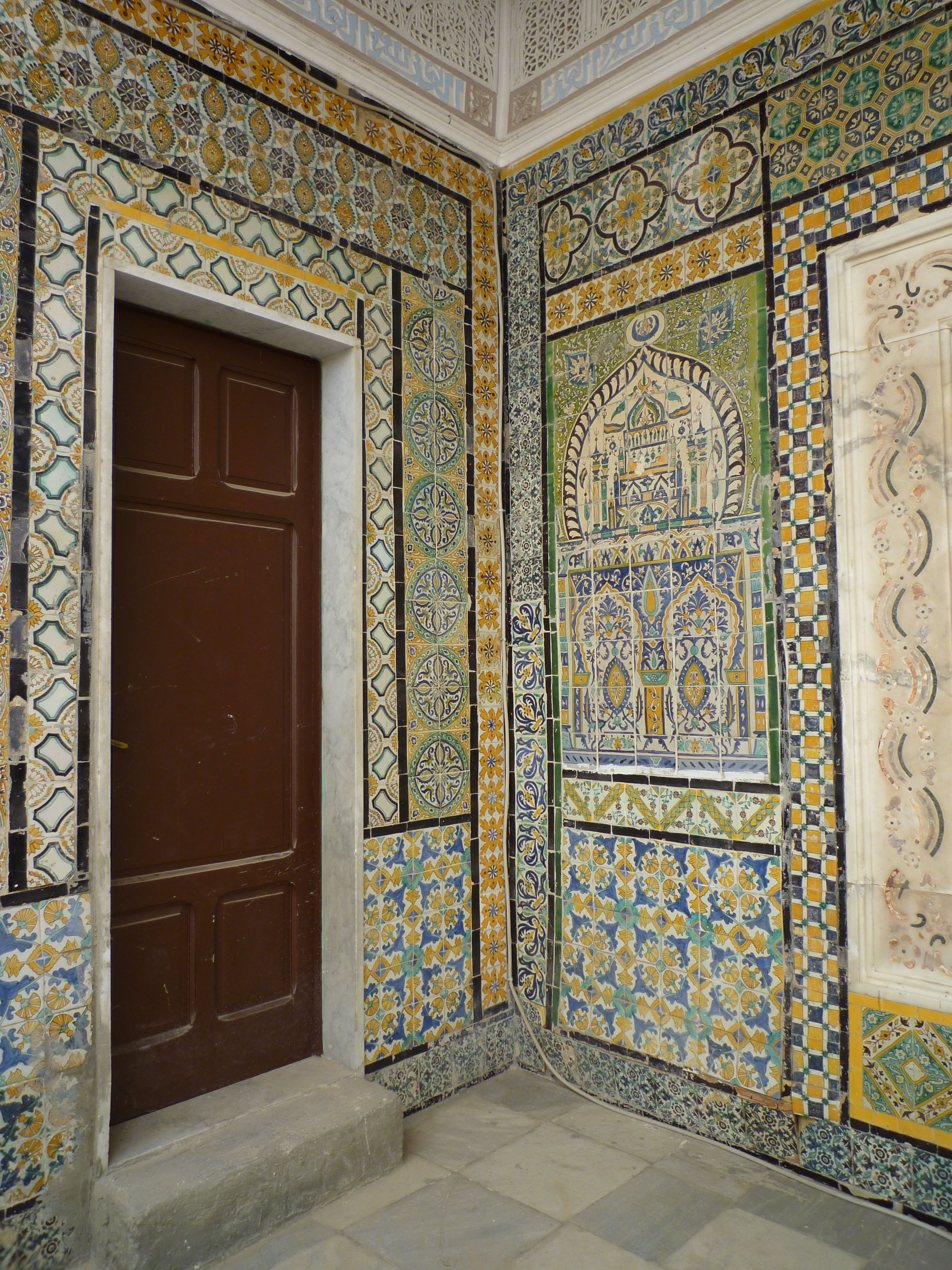
Qallaline-style tilework in the Gurgi Mosque in Tripoli, Libya

In addition to being used in local buildings, they were also widely exported to Algeria, Libya, Egypt, and in some cases even to Spain. The Gurgi Mosque in Tripoli, Libya, also has tile panels in a style identical to those of Tunis and Kairouan. In Egypt, Qallalin tiles are found in the Mosque of Abu al-Dhahab in Cairo, in the Mosque of Ibrahim Terbana in Alexandria, and in the Mosque of Salah Agha Duqmaqsis in Rosetta. In Constantine and Algiers they are mostly found in palaces.

== See also ==
- El Ghriba Synagogue in Djerba, which contains tiles reminiscent of the Qallalin type
