= Uzziel Elha'ik =

Tunisian rabbi

Uzziel Elḥa'ik

Personal life
- Died: 1812 Tunis, Ottoman Tunisia

Religious life
- Religion: Judaism

Uzziel Elḥa'ik (Hebrew: עוזיאל בר מרדכי אלחאייך; died 1812) was a Tunisian rabbi.

Elḥa'ik authored two significant works, both published posthumously. The first, Mishkenot ha-Ro'im (Livorno, 1860), is a collection of 1,499 responsa relating to the history of Tunisian Judaism during the 17th and 18th centuries. The second, Ḥayyim va-Ḥesed (Livorno, 1865), is a compilation of 22 funeral orations delivered by Elḥa'ik on the deaths of various rabbis of Tunis.

== Publications ==
- Mishkenot ha-Ro'im (in Hebrew). Livorno. 1860.
- Ḥayyim va-Ḥesed (in Hebrew). Livorno. 1865.
