= Sulayman Pasha Mosque =

Mosque in Cairo, Egypt

- مسجد سليمان باشا الخادم
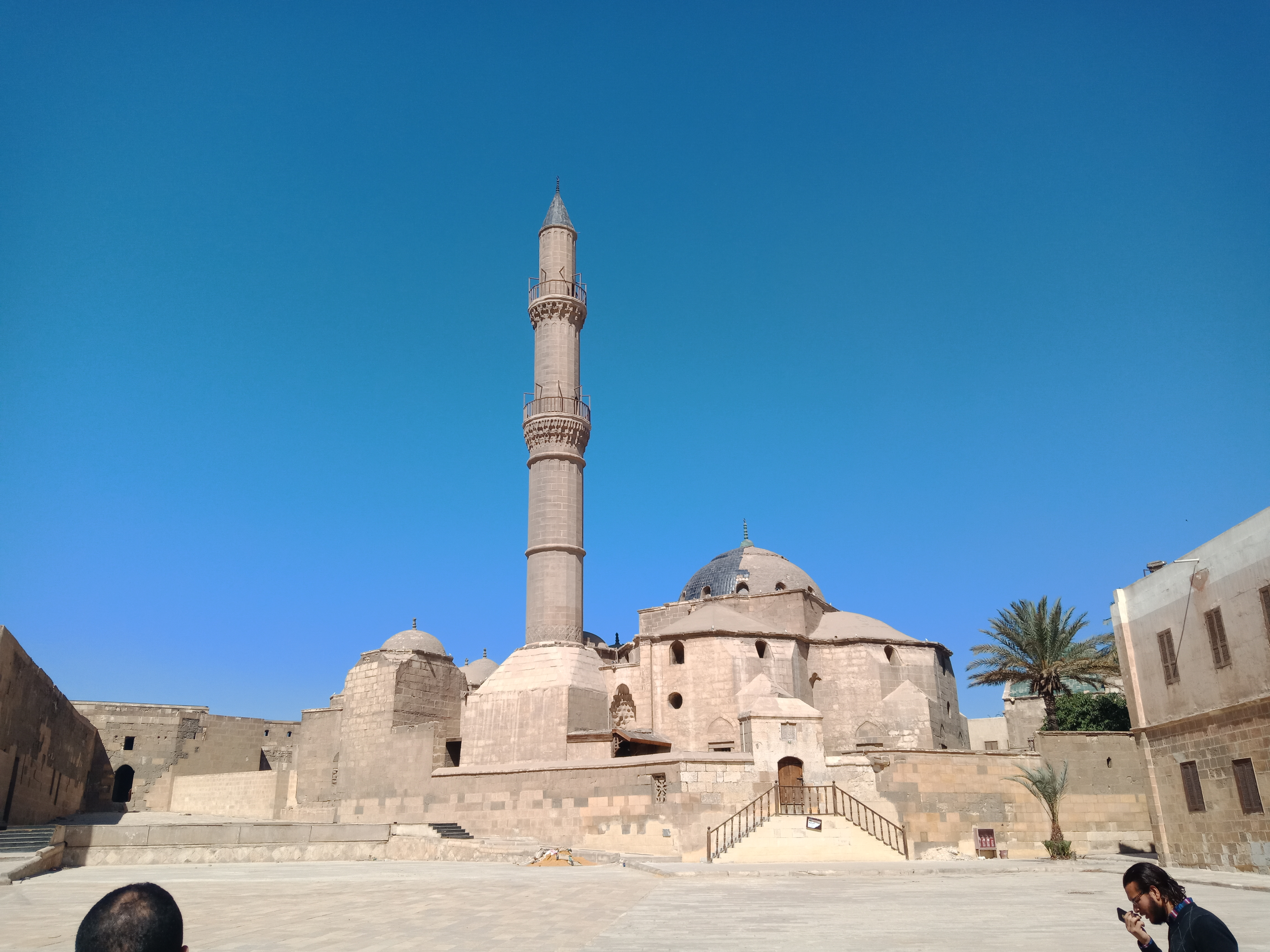

Religion
- Affiliation: Islam
- Ecclesiastical or organisational status: Mosque; Mausoleum; Shrine
- Status: Active

Location
- Location: Cairo Citadel, Islamic Cairo
- Country: Egypt
- Interactive map of Sulayman Pasha Mosque
- Coordinates: 30°03′29″N 31°13′44″E

Architecture
- Type: Mosque
- Style: Egyptian-Ottoman
- Founder: Hadim Suleiman Pasha
- Completed: 1528 CE

Specifications
- Dome: 10 (maybe more)
- Minaret: 1
- Shrine: 1: (Sariat al-Jabal)
- Materials: Marble; stone; tiles

The Sulayman Pasha Mosque, (Note: Also variously spelled as Suleiman.) also known as the Sulayman Pasha al-Khadem Mosque (Arabic: مسجد سليمان باشا الخادم), and as the Sariat al-Jabal Mosque, (Note: The shrine is dedicated in honour of Sariat al-Jabal.) is a mosque, mausoleum and shrine, located inside the Citadel at the top of Mount Mokattam, in Islamic Cairo, Egypt. The mosque was completed in 1528 CE by Suleiman Pasha Al-Khadem, one of the Ottoman-era rulers of Egypt. It was originally erected for the use of the janissaries stationed in the northern enclosure. It is the first mosque established in Egypt in Ottoman architectural style.

== History ==
=== Founder: Suleiman Pasha Al-Khadem ===
Suleiman Pasha Al-Khadem, also known as Hadim Suleiman Pasha, was a prominent statesman during the Ottoman Empire. Prior to his rise, many believed that no statesman would be able to replace Ibrahim Pasha; he was regarded as an excellent leader who handled affairs of state with ease and agency. Yet, after the death of Ibrahim Pasha, Hadim Suleiman Pasha was able to gain similar amounts of prominence, rising through the ranks due to his focus on establishing control of the Red Sea and the Persian Gulf.

=== Construction ===
The Sulayman Pasha Mosque was built in 1528 after the first renovation of the Citadel. Suleiman Pasha became governor of Egypt in the 15th century; and the new building expressed his power. Suleiman Pasha engaged Egyptian craftsmen and an architect to build the mosque.

The Sulayman Pasha Mosque is one example of the synthesis of architectural innovations that occurred in Egypt during the Ottoman Empire. The golden age of the Ottoman Empire, in particular, led to the rise of the architect, Mimar Sinan, who introduced many innovative designs that inspired the Islamic world and architecture more generally.

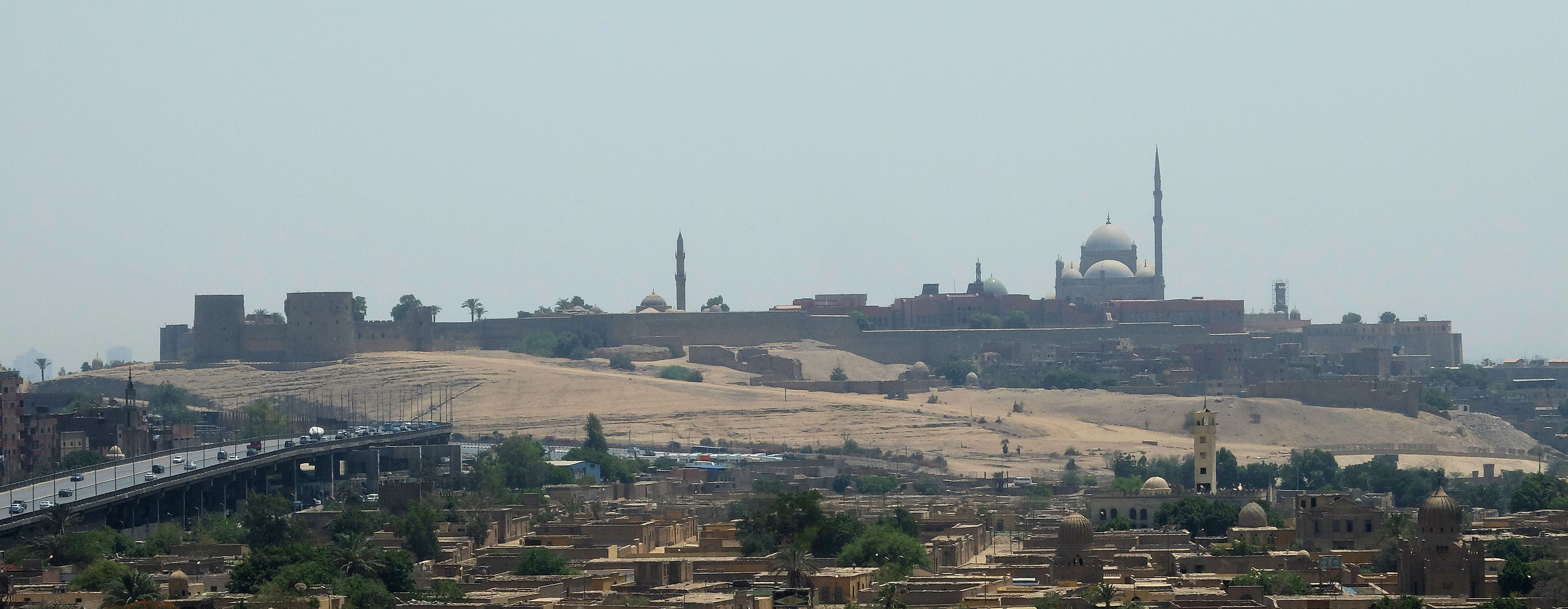
Northern view of the Citadel, with the mosque's dome and minaret (center-left)

Before the Ottoman period began, the Mamluk style heavily influenced mosque architecture. While other areas in the Islamic world, such as then-Syria, were able to embrace the presence of the Ottoman style, it was not easy for Egypt to directly embrace and incorporate Ottoman elements at first. This was because Egypt, and Cairo in particular, was the center for the Mamluk Sultanate's golden age. As a result, when the Sulayman Pasha Mosque was built, it incorporated elements from both Ottoman and Cairene architecture.

While light restorations likely took place, the overall scheme of the mosque is original. Until restoration in the 20th century, a large model boat hung within the arcades adjoining the tomb of the mosque; as a reference to Pharaonic burial customs.

== Architecture ==
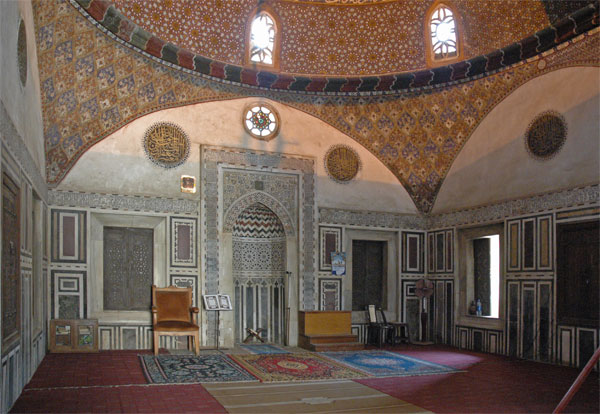
Interior of the prayer hall, with the mihrab (center)

The mosque is a T-form variant, which is a distinct Ottoman design. The mosque consists of two sections and is covered with a dome in the center surrounded by semi-domes decorated with colored inscriptions. It is a prominent Ottoman architectural design. The domes of the mosque are all covered with green qashani geographic patterns. The central dome rests on spherical pendentives and includes vegetal decoration.

The entrance of the mosque leads directly into the first half of the mosque: the prayer hall. This hall is flanked by three semi-domes, which open to a central sahn.

=== Eastern interior section ===
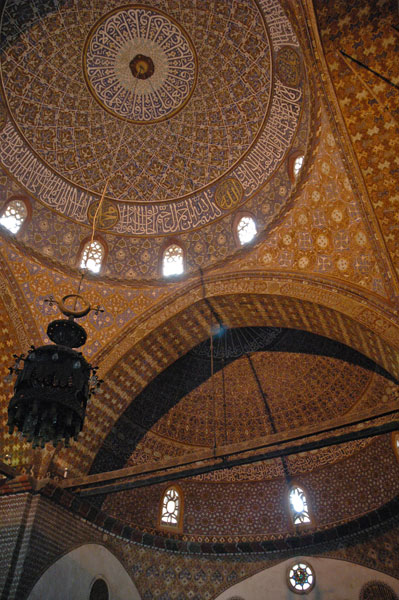
Interior view of the dome and semi-domes

On the first section, the decorations are interspersed with various writings, and marble walls covering the bottom ends with a strip of Kufic line and flowered Qur'anic verses. At the middle of the eastern wall, there exists mihrab and a marble platform. Specifically in this area, there are two iwans: on the first iwan, there are decorations interspersed with various writings that also include Qur'anic verses.

==== Inscriptions ====
One of the Qur'anic verses is a handsome inscription that encircles the dome, a prominent and elevated place for the written word, the basis of the Universal Law of Islam, (Quran 3:189-194):

"To God belongs the Kingdom of the heavens and of the earth; and God is powerful over everything.
Surely in the creation of the heavens and earth and in the alternation of night and day there are signs for men possessed of minds who remember God;
Standing and sitting on their sides, And reflect upon the creation of the heavens and the earth:
'Our Lord, Thou has not created this for vanity, Glory be to Thee!
Guard us against the chastisement of the Fire.
Our Lord, whomsoever Thou admittest into the Fire, Thou wilt have abased; and the evildoers shall have no helpers.
Our Lord, we have heard a caller calling us to belief, saying, "Believe you in your Lord!" And we believe.
Our Lord, forgive Thou us our sins and acquit us of our evil deeds, and take us to Thee with the pious.
Our Lord, give us what Thou has promised us by Thy Messengers, and abase us not on the Day of Resurrection:
Thou wilt not fail the tryst."

These Qur'anic verses are engraved in Kufic script in black on white marble, which was a technique taken from the Mamluk period. The first iwan also has the mihrab and a marble platform. The second iwan has a minbar with various vegetal leaf designs.

=== Western interior section ===
The western wall leads to the second section of the mosque, which faces the qibla. The front of this wall has the dikkat al-muballigh, or the elevated platform designed to call people for worship. The dikkat al-muballigh is supported by wooden brackets. Parts of the inner walls also have marble dadoes, which were a key part of Mamluk architecture. Above the dado, there exists curved marble inlaid with paste. There is also a marble pulpit, which is carved and painted, located on top of the conical top inside the mosque. The interior has a marble floor, which also has geometric patterns. Taking a broader view, the second section is an open middle sahn whose floor is decorated with colored marble. It is surrounded by four arches covered by semi-domes, which are mounted on its shoulders, and on the western side of the sahn is a small dome with several tombs with marble structures. Tombs are covered with different models of headstone that were prevalent at the time.

=== Exterior ===
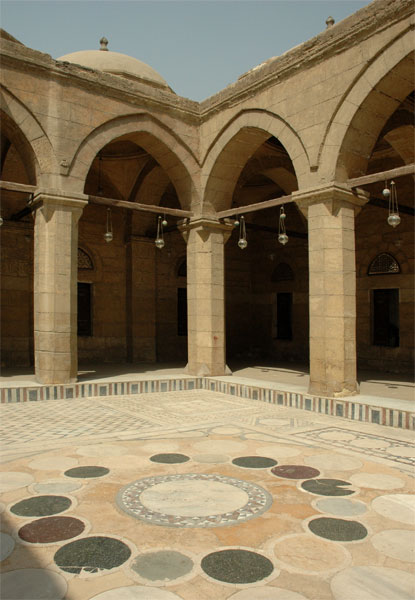
Partial view of the sahn and its marble paving

In the outside of the mosque, the building is in the shape of a rectangle. It depicts nine smaller domes on the rest of the building. The front door brings the person in the center of the rectangle, which shows the prayer hall. With the rectangular shape of the building, it also includes the sahn. Another sahn is located in the northern side. Egyptian craftsmen constructed the marble walls.

==== Sahn ====
The exterior sahn is also paved with marble; and is surrounded by shallow domes, that are decorated with green tiles.

The sahn has a shrine from the Fatimid period, which was created by Abu Mansur Qastah Ghulam al-Muzaffar ibn Amir al-Juyush, who was governor of Alexandria, the capital of the Fatimid Caliphate, in c. 1140 CE. It was created to house his tomb, and now also includes the tombs of other Ottoman officials. In addition, this shrine was dedicated to Sidi Sariya, who was a companion of the Prophet Muhammad. Within the shine, there are cenotaphs and turbans crafted in marble. The shrine is covered by a dome that is much larger than the other domes in the sahn.

On the western side of the sahn there is a small dome with several tombs containing marble structures. Tombs are covered with different models of headstone that were prevalent at the time.

The north side of this sahn contains another entrance that leads to another sahn that has a kuttab, and blue-tiled domes. The complex was completed by a sabil, no longer extant, and a perimeter wall which encompasses other, subsidiary courts and gardens.

==== Minaret ====
The stone minaret is located to the left of the entrance of the mosque; and is believed to be one of the most elegant minarets in Cairo. The shaft of the minaret is very tall, standing at twice the height of the tallest mosque wall. The minaret is mainly in the Ottoman style, presenting a cylindrical faceted shaft with a conical finial. In addition, the minaret has two balconies. Each balcony juts out from the body and is adorned and supported by three tiers of multicolored muqarnas. The two balconies, both with wooden railings, also have various carvings on them, a distinct trait of Mamluk architecture.

The minaret exterior also has three rings of blind arches below the cap of the minaret and below the two balconies. Beneath the first balcony, there are also two rings of horizontal moldings. On top of the minaret, there is a cone covered with green panels. These panels were produced in the ceramic workshop of Sultan Qansuh al-Ghawri. Notably, there have been similar tiles spotted in Shahin al-Khalwati mosque. The minaret is cylindrical with two ribs, each jutting out from the body and adorned with multicolored muqarnas. It is topped with a cone covered with green panels. This type of minaret was used in most of the mosques established during the Ottoman era.

== See also ==
- Islam in Egypt
- List of mausoleums in Cairo
- List of mosques in Cairo
- List of Historic Monuments in Cairo
