= Mosque of Ibrahim Terbana =

Mosque in Alexandria, Egypt

- مسجد ابراهيم تربانة
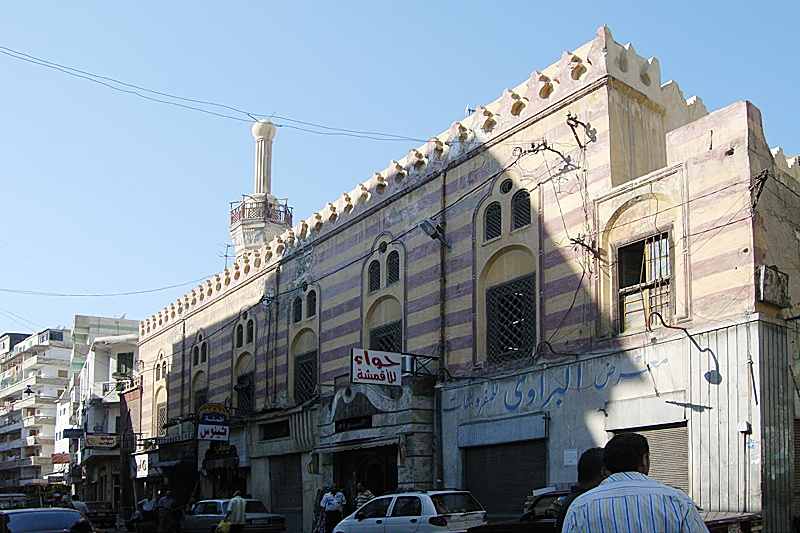

- Location of the mosque in the Nile Delta

Religion
- Affiliation: Islam
- Ecclesiastical or organisational status: Mosque
- Status: Active

Location
- Location: El Gomrok, Alexandria
- Country: Egypt
- Interactive map of Mosque of Ibrahim Terbana
- Coordinates: 31°12′03″N 29°53′14″E

Architecture
- Type: Mosque
- Completed: c. 1685

Specifications
- Minaret: 1
- Materials: Bricks

The Mosque of Ibrahim Terbana (Arabic: مسجد ابراهبم تربانة, romanized: Masjid Ibrāhym Terbānā), also known as the Terbana Mosque, is a mosque in the El Gomrok neighbourhood of Alexandria, on the north coast of Egypt. The mosque is located in Faransa Street.

== History ==
The mosque was completed in c. 1685 by Hajj Ibrahim Terbana, a Moroccan merchant.

Restorations on the mosque started in 2010 and to protect the sanctity of the mosque, E£23 million was invested into the restoration with the aim of stopping encroachment by tourists and worshippers.

== Architecture ==
The building has two floors; the ground floor is occupied with shops and the mosque is on the first floor, which makes it a so-called "hanging mosque". The exterior of the mosque is white, except for the doorway which is built from brick painted red and black in the Delta style. The wooden door is below a pointed trefoil blind arch that consists of and is surrounded by painted red and black brickwork that forms geometric motifs. The rectangular prayer hall is separated by two rows of four columns each and covered by a decorated wooden ceiling. The mihrab is covered with ceramic tiles in a North African style with floral motifs.

The mosque's minaret is supported by two Corinthian capital antique columns. The right capital incorporates a small face with a widely opened mouth. The minaret's square socle above the columns leads to an octagonal section above it which is covered by a terrace, with a cylinder-shaped section on top.

== Gallery ==
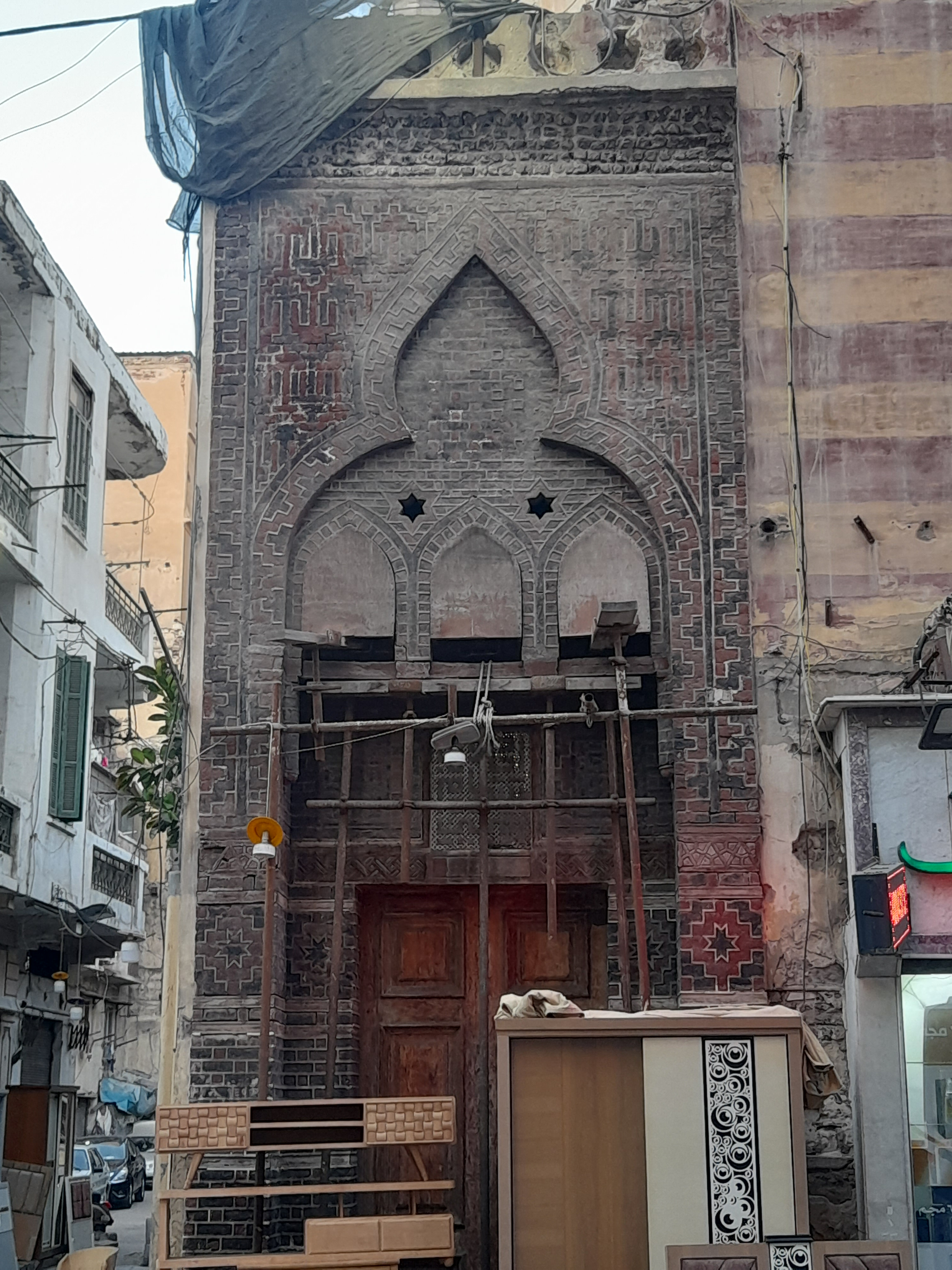
Street doorway of the mosque with the geometric brickwork

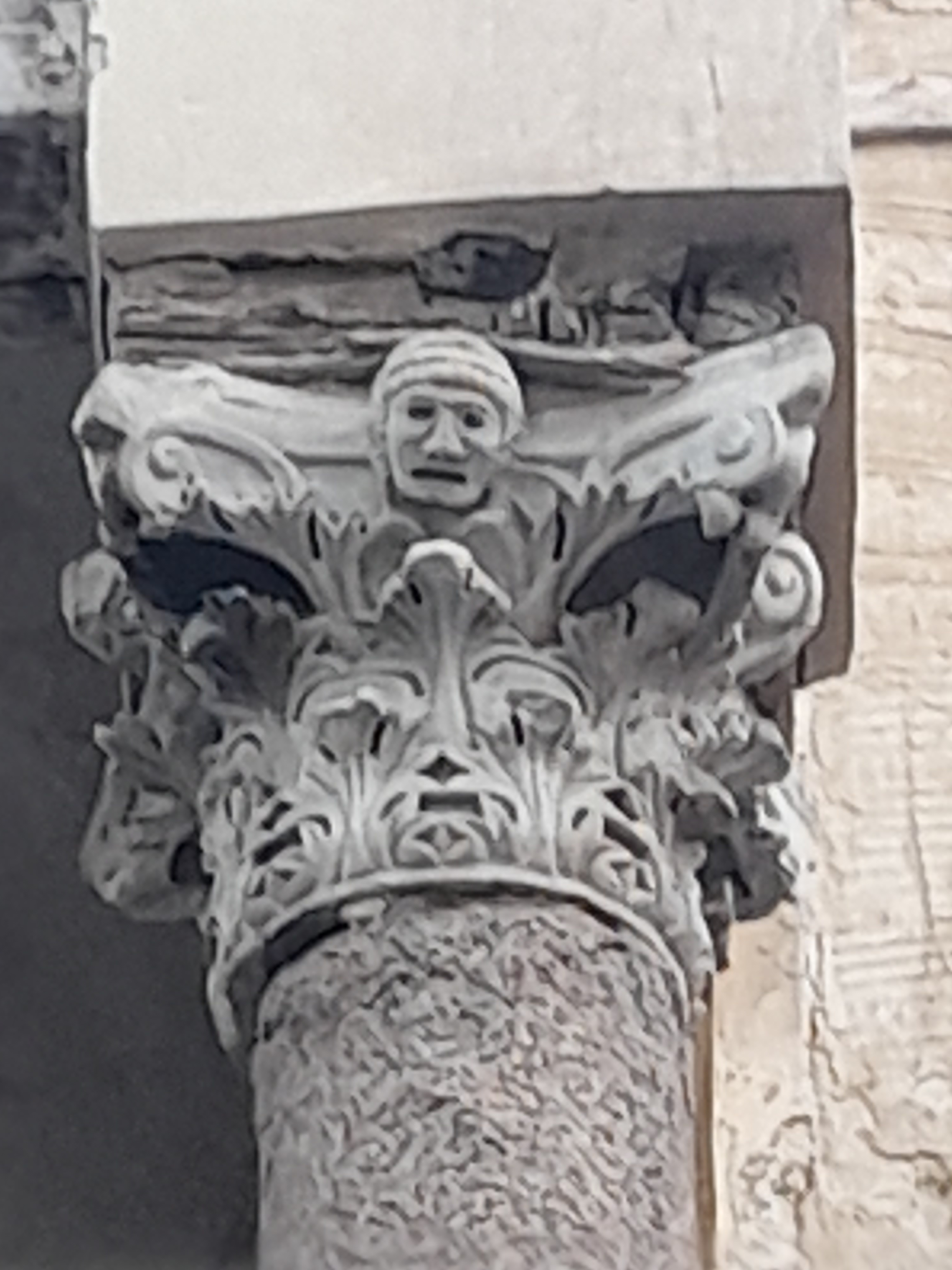
One of the Corinthian capitals

== See also ==
- Islam in Egypt
- List of mosques in Alexandria
- List of mosques in Egypt
