= El Gomrok =

El Gomrok الجمرك
- District
- Location in Egypt
- Coordinates: 31.254451°N 29.974519°E
- Country: Egypt
- Governorate: Alexandria
- City: Alexandria
- Time zone: UTC+2 (EET)
  - Summer (DST): UTC+3 (EEST)

El Gomrok (Arabic: الجمرك, meaning "The Customshouse") is an administrative district in Alexandria, Egypt. Alexandria's historic old town is located in El Gomrok.

== See also ==
- Neighborhoods in Alexandria
