= Sinan Pasha Mosque (Cairo) =

Mosque in Cairo, Egypt

- مسجد سنان باشا
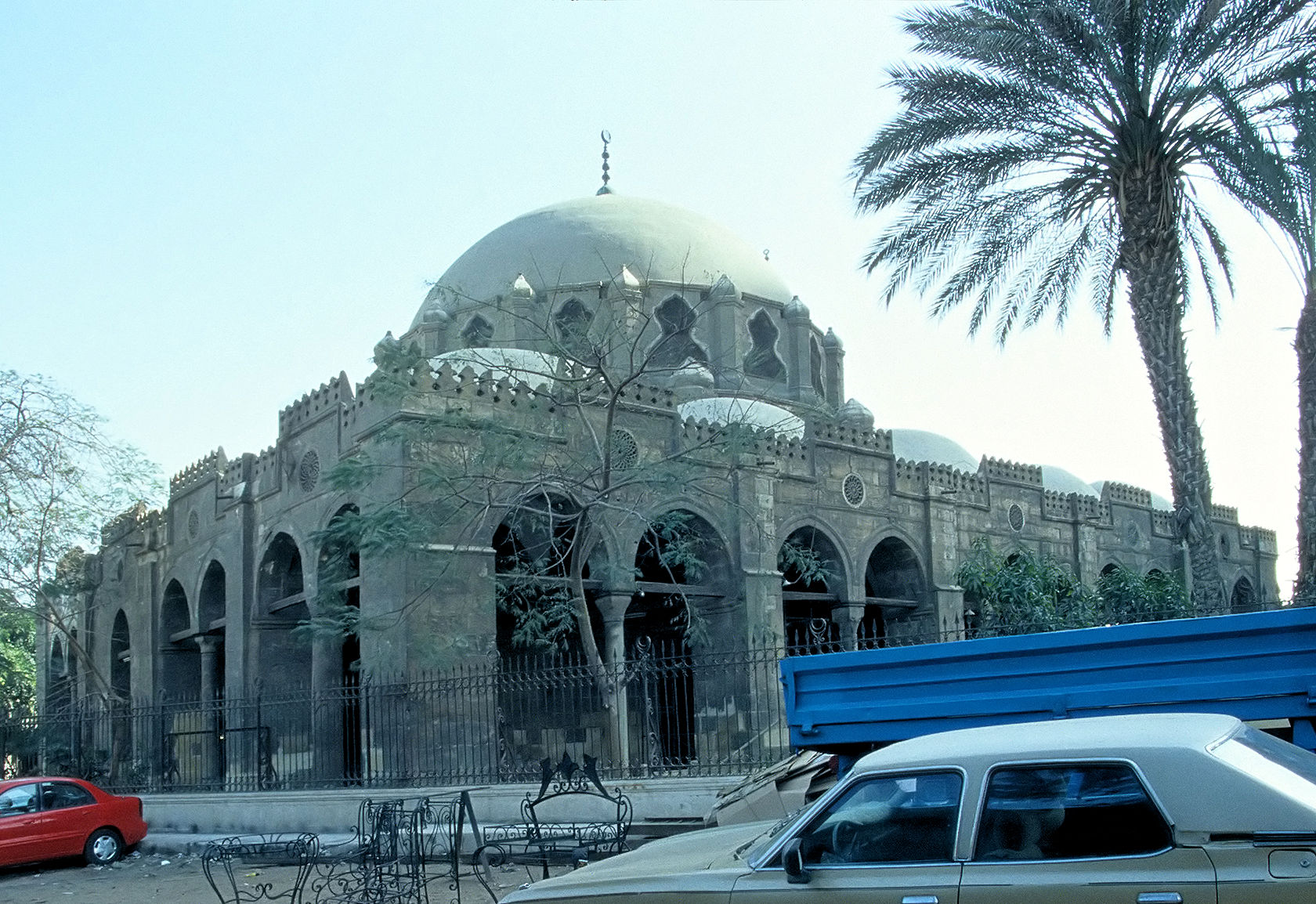

Religion
- Affiliation: Islam
- Ecclesiastical or organizational status: Mosque
- Status: Active

Location
- Location: Boulaq, Downtown Cairo
- Country: Egypt
- Interactive map of Sinan Pasha Mosque
- Coordinates: 30°03′44″N 31°13′46″E

Architecture
- Type: Mosque
- Founder: Koca Sinan Pasha
- Completed: c. 1571 CE

Specifications
- Direction of façade: Northwest
- Dome: 1
- Dome dia. (outer): c. 15 m (49 ft)
- Minaret: 1

The Sinan Pasha Mosque (Arabic: مسجد سنان باشا) is a mosque in the Boulaq district of Downtown Cairo, Egypt. It was established by the governor of Cairo Koca Sinan Pasha in c. 1571 CE.

When the mosque was built the site was on the Nile shore which has since shifted westward. The mosque's architecture combines Mamluk and Ottoman features. The last include its free-standing position in a garden and the gallery surrounding its square prayer hall on three sides roofed with eleven shallow domes. The dome roofing the prayer hall is the largest stone dome in Cairo. The mosque has a pencil-shaped minaret at its southern corner. The prayer hall's three entrance portals are decorated with Muqarnas.

The interior is influenced by the Fadawiya Mausoleum. There is a wooden dikka on the northeastern side.

The mosque was once part of a complex with three khans. Its hamam still exists.

== See also ==
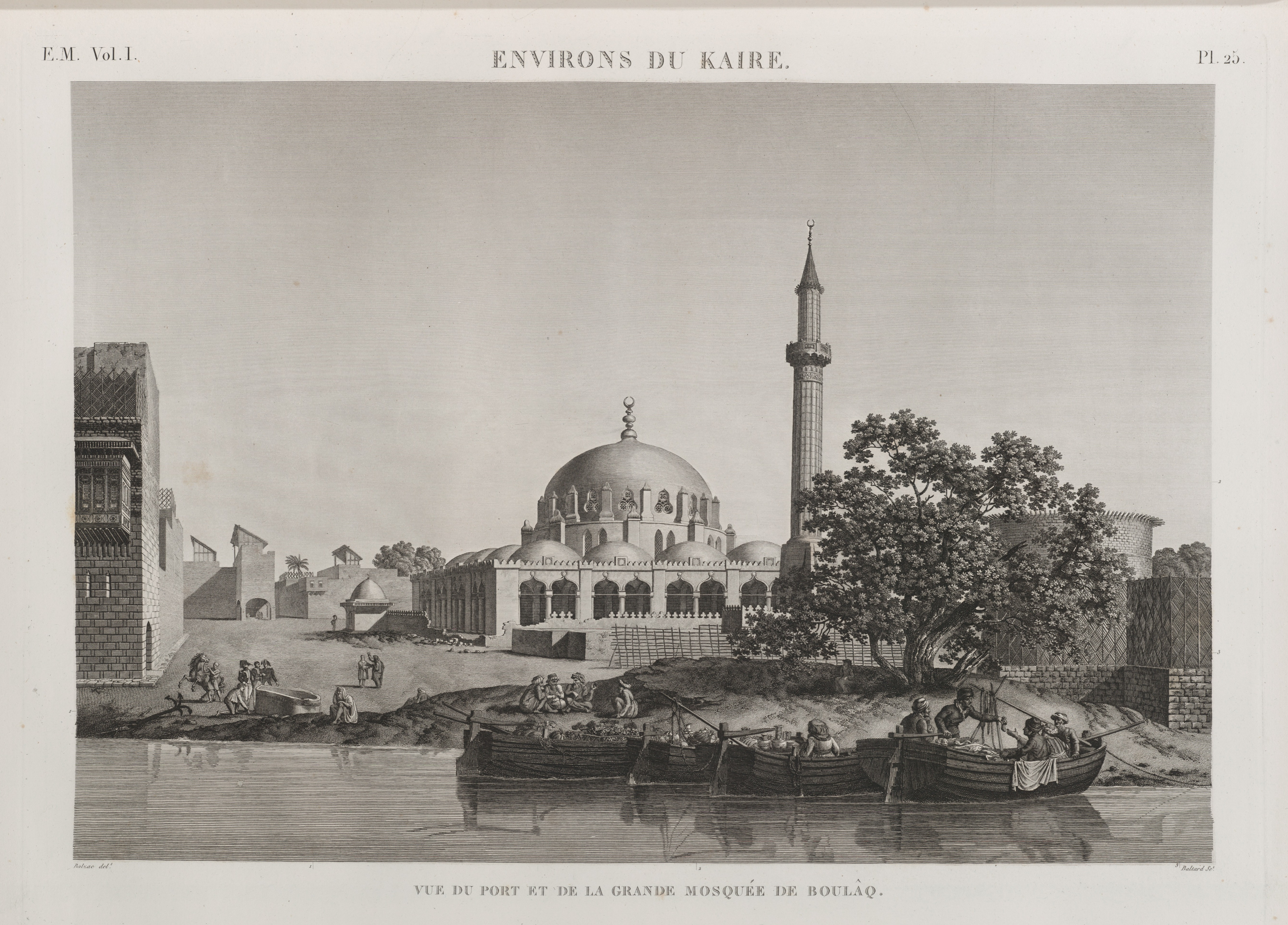
c. 1800 sketch

- Islam in Egypt
- List of mosques in Cairo
