= Medieval Cairo =

Medieval Cairo may refer to:

- History of Cairo during the Middle Ages
- Islamic Cairo, part of central Cairo
