= HCRP =

HCRP may refer to:

- Hardcopy Cable Replacement Profile, Bluetooth
- Historic Cairo Restoration Project, Egypt
