= Bab al-Futuh =

Gate in the Old City of Cairo, Egypt

Coordinates: 30°3′19.90″N 31°15′48.32″E

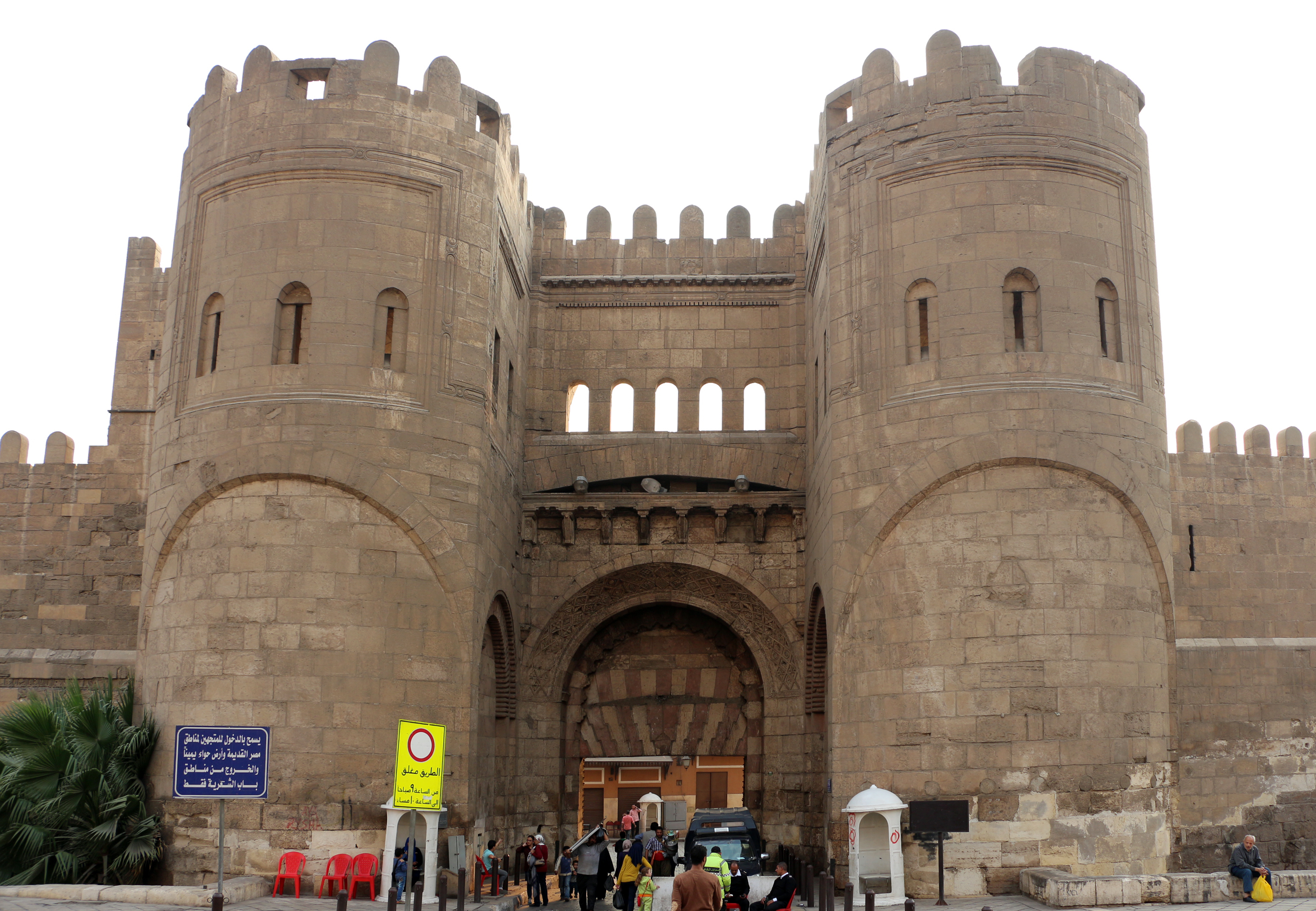
Bab al-Futuh

Bab al-Futuh (Arabic: باب الفتوح, lit. 'Conquest Gate') is one of three remaining gates in the city wall of the old city of Cairo, Egypt. It is located at the northern end of al-Mu'izz Street. The other two remaining gates are Bab al-Nasr (Victory Gate) in the north and Bab Zuwayla (Gate of Zuwayla) in the south. The gate was built during the Fatimid period, originally in the 10th century, then rebuilt in its current form in the late 11th century.

== History ==
When Cairo was originally founded in 969 by the Fatimid general Jawhar, on behalf of Caliph al-Mu'izz, it was surrounded by a set of city walls built in brick and pierced by multiple gates. Later, during the reign of Caliph al-Mustansir, the vizier and army commander Badr al-Gamali rebuilt the city walls and its gates in stone. The present gate was thus completed in 1087, along with the neighbouring Bab al-Nasr gate. Bab al-Futuh was originally called Bab al-Iqbal, or "the Gate of Prosperity", but was given its present name when Badr al-Gamali reconstructed it.

== Architecture ==
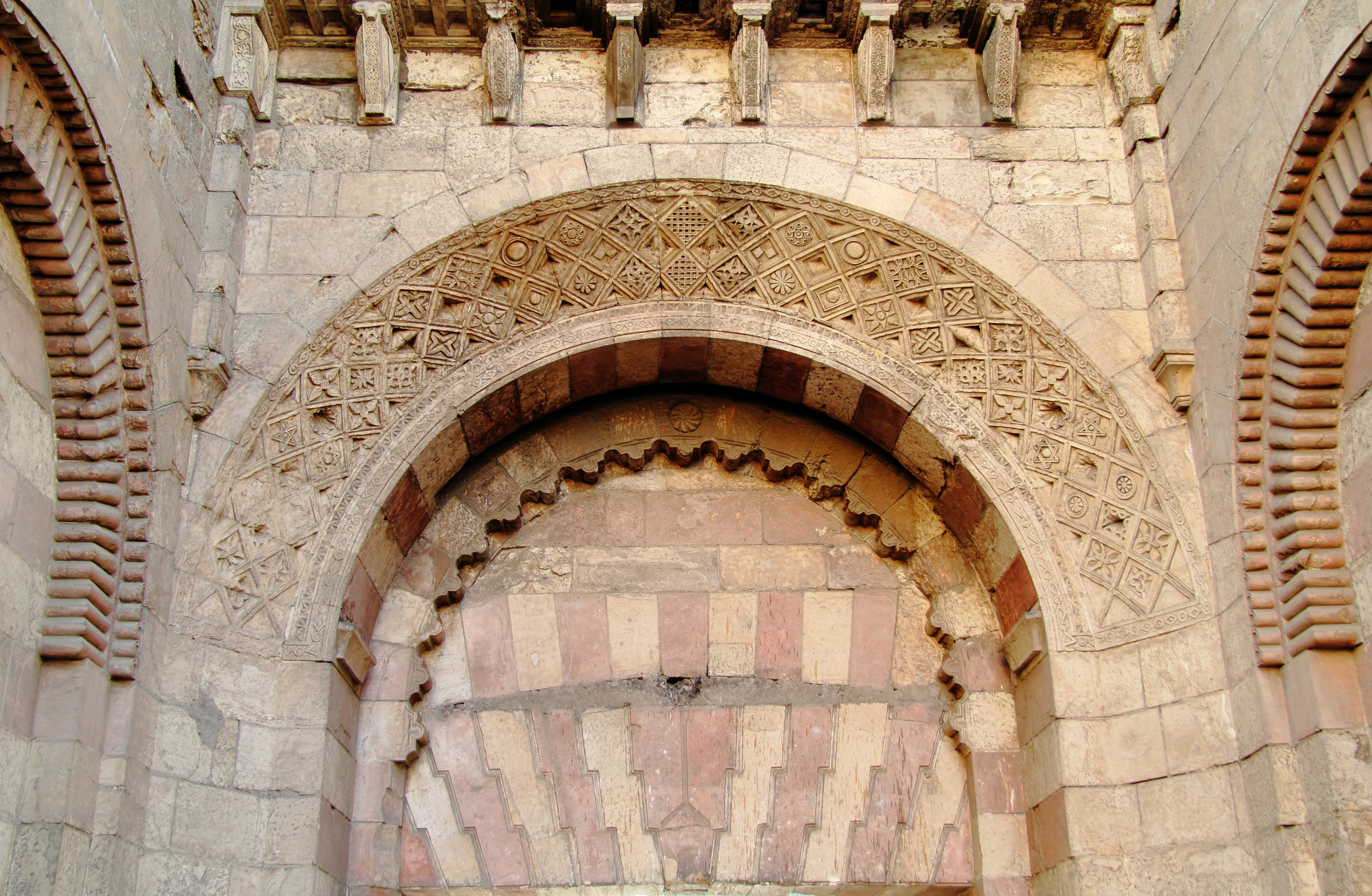
Stonework details of the gate

The gate is 22 metres (72 ft) tall 23 metres (75 ft) wide. The lower two-thirds of the gate are built in solid stone, while the upper third was built in rubble stone encased in by solid, finely dressed stone. The gate has a defensive design and its entrance is flanked by two tall towers of round shape. Its decoration and craftsmanship are more extensive and of higher quality than that of nearby Bab al-Nasr. The details of its stonework also suggest the influence of northern Syrian or Byzantine architectural traditions or craftsmen.

On its outer façade, the gate's entrance is surmounted by a splayed arch covered by a stone-carved pattern of lozenges with rosette and cross motifs inside them. Above this is an overhanging section that projects outward from the wall between the towers. This feature was a predecessor of the machicoulis. The overhang is supported on stone brackets, two of which are carved with the shape of ram's head, a symbol of Mars in the zodiac (known in Arabic as al-Qahir and associated with the founding of Cairo, called al-Qahira). Between the brackets are stone-carved rectangles with decorative such as vegetal designs and an eight-pointed star. The inner sides of the towers flanking the gate are carved with large blind arches with "cushion"-style voussoirs. Shallow blind arches are also carved across the front of the towers. Above these arches are recessed rectangular zones pierced by arrowslit windows. A stone-carved molding, consisting of two parallel lines with loops between them, runs along the upper façade of the gate. This is the earliest example of a decorative feature that later recurred frequently in Mamluk architecture (13th to 16th centuries). There are no inscriptions on the façade of the gate itself, but an inscription in floriated Kufic can be seen nearby to the east, on the outer façade of the wall salient around the northern minaret of the adjacent al-Hakim Mosque.

Inside the gate, the vestibule is covered by a shallow semi-spherical dome. The transition between the dome and the rectangular space below is achieved through the use of pendentives, a feature more typical of Byzantine architecture. Through a doorway on the east side is the tomb of an unidentified figure, known as the Sidi Zouk Tomb. Through another door on the west side is a long vaulted chamber.

Details of the gate

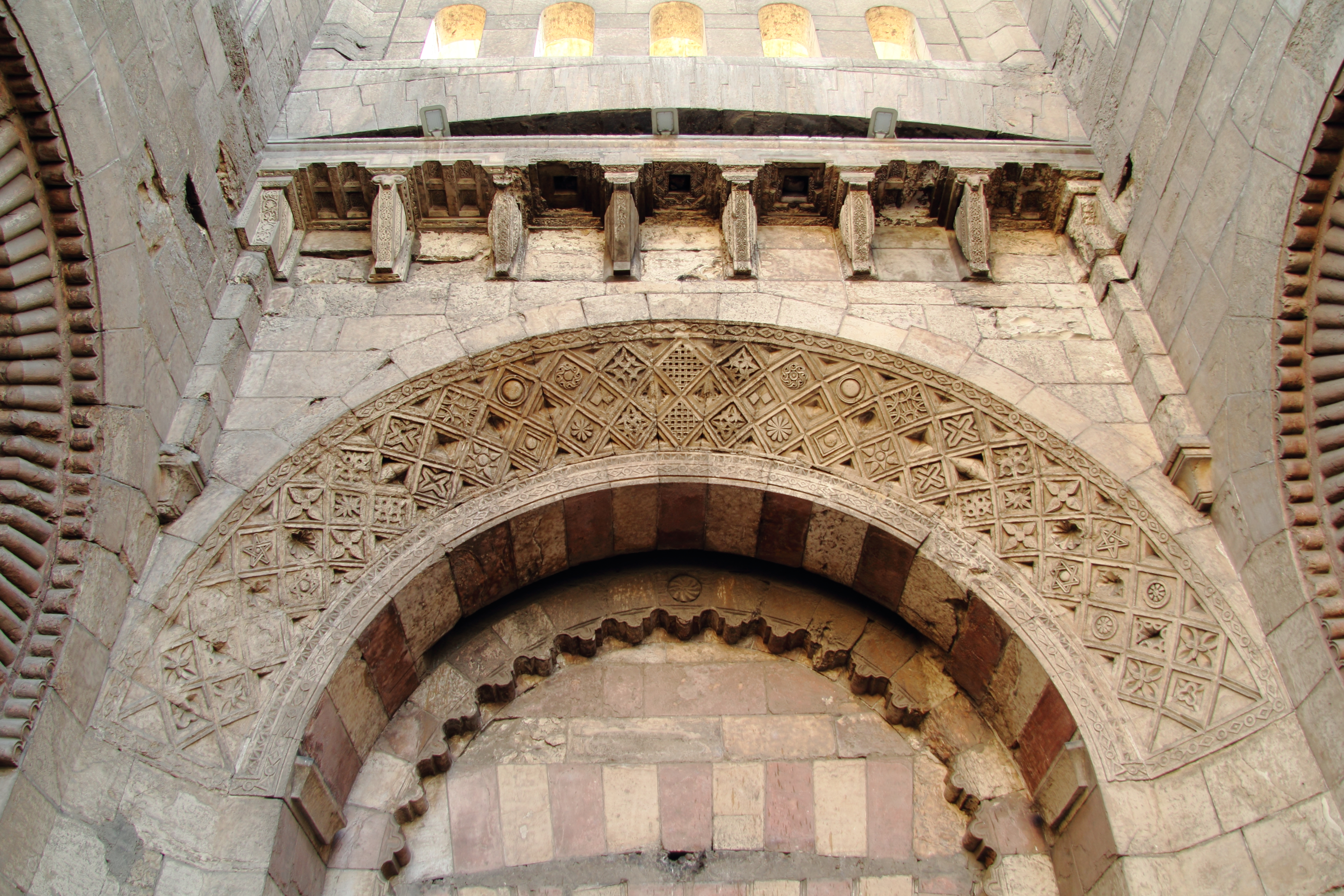
Details above the gate

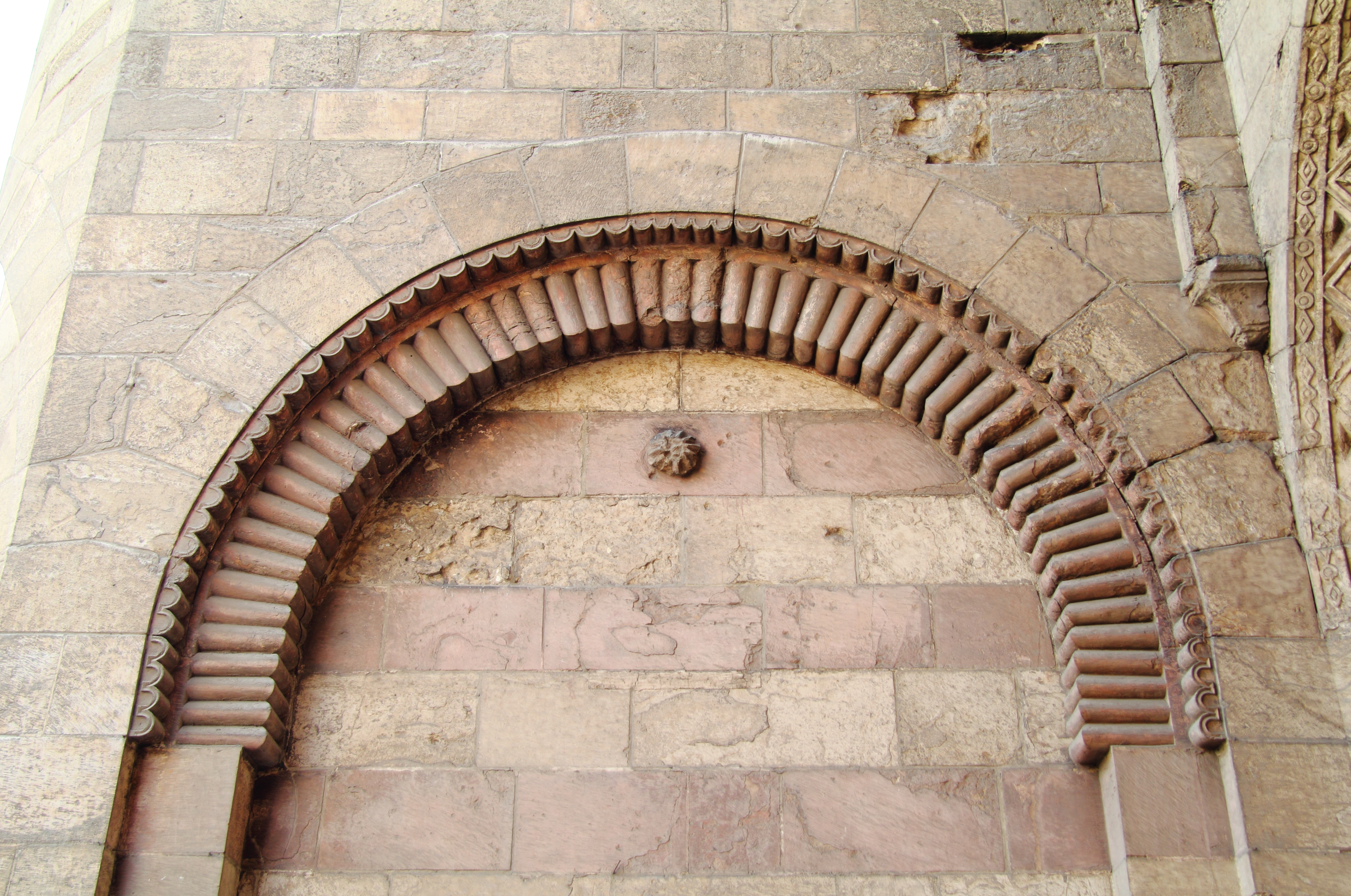
Blind arch with "cushion" voussoirs on the inner side of the flanking towers

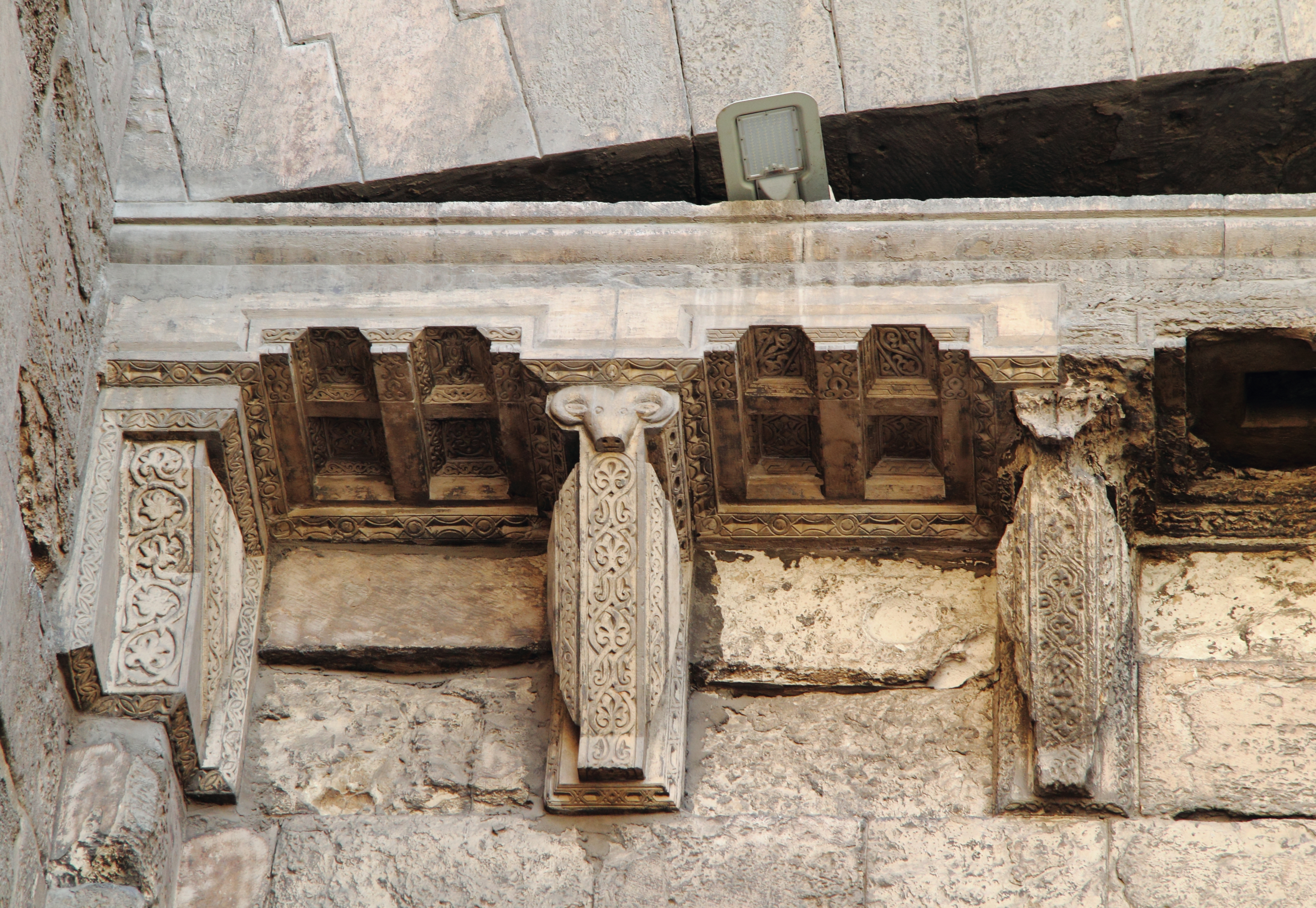
Detail of the stone brackets of the overhang above the gate

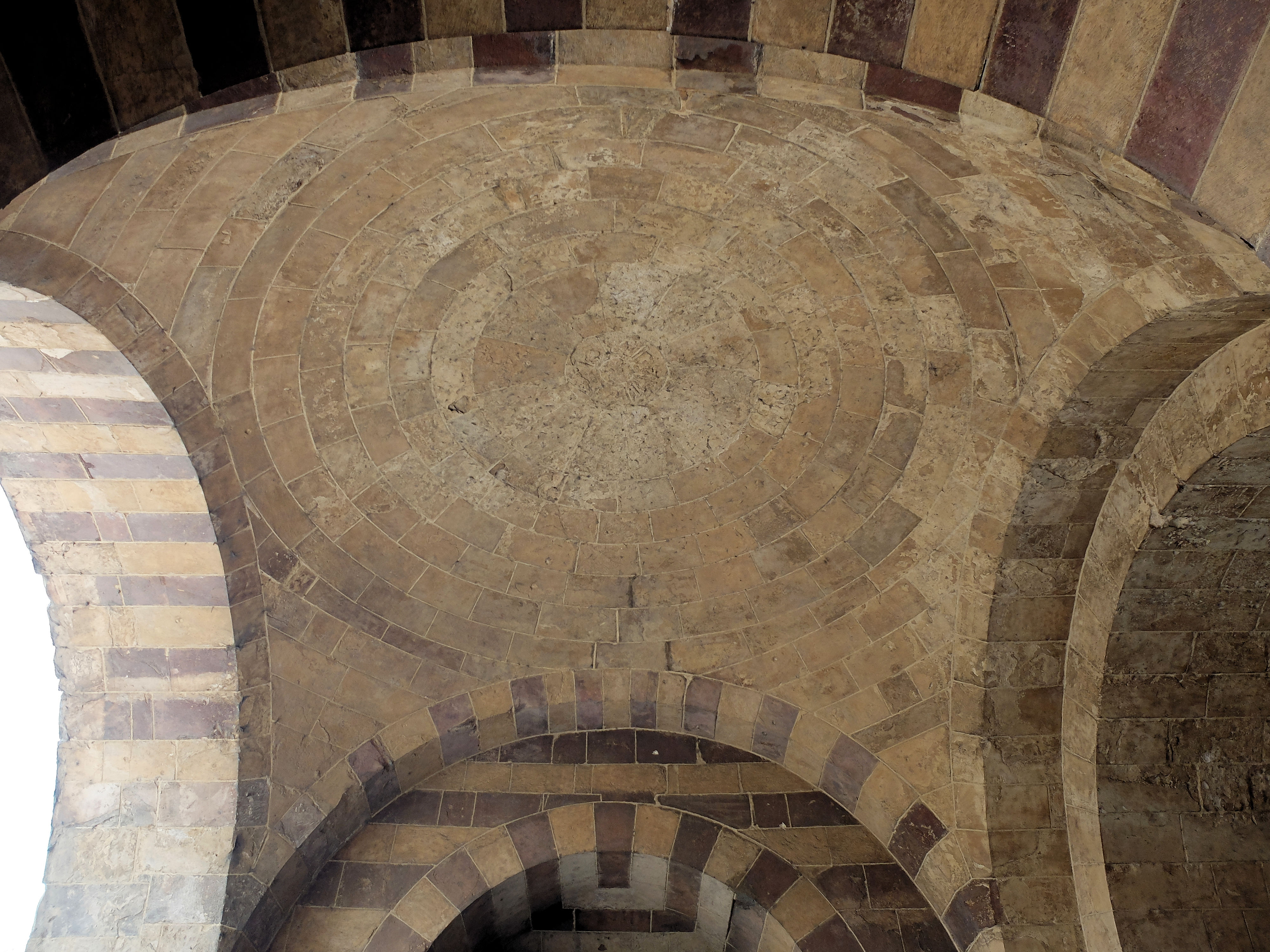
Vaulting inside the passage of the gate

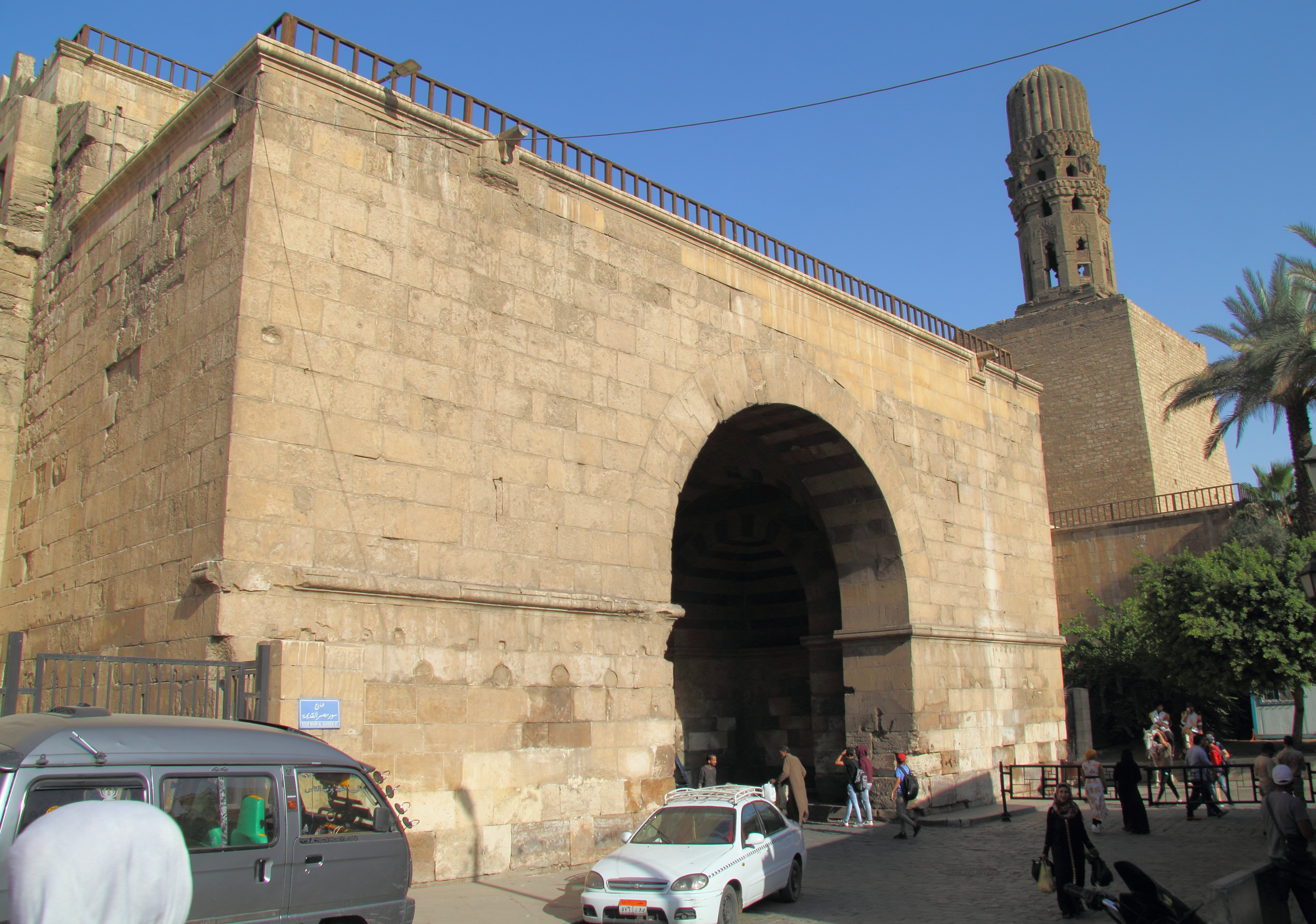
Inner side of Bab al-Futuh

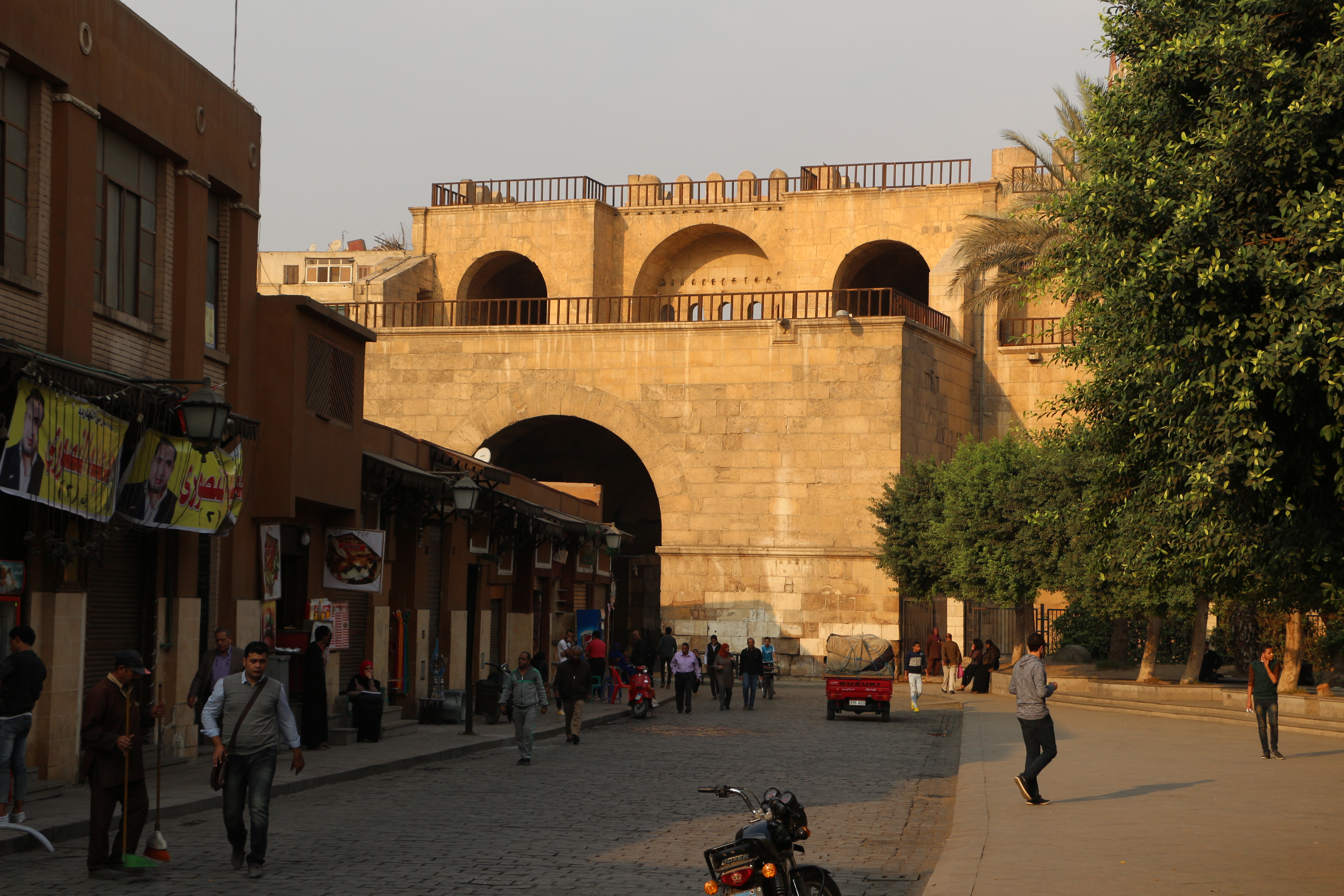
Inner side of Bab al-Futuh (more distant view with upper level visible)

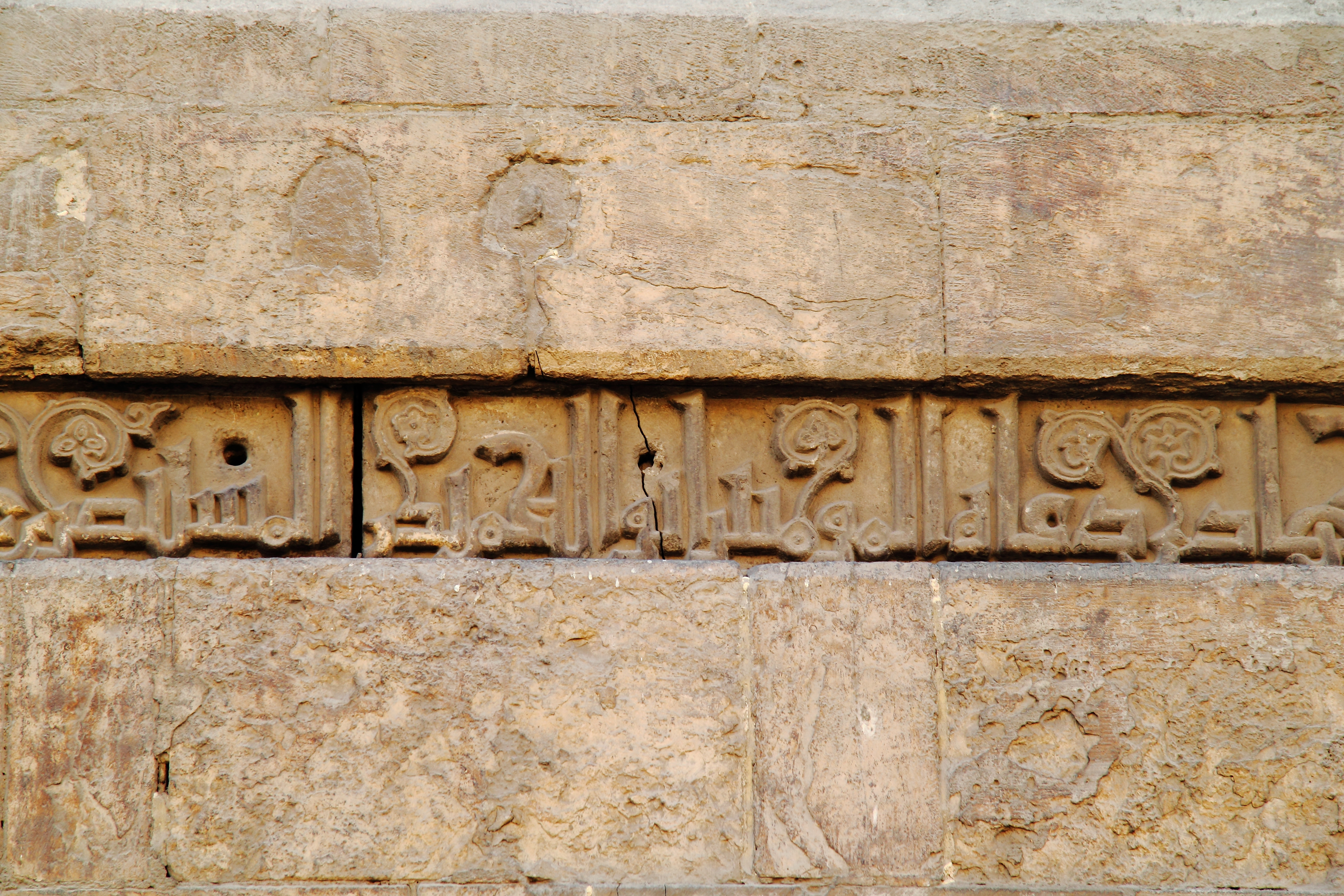
A part of the Fatimid-era Kufic inscription on the walls east of the gate

== In art ==
Vittore Carpaccio represented the Bab al-Futuh in his 1502 painting, St. George and the Dragon.

== See also ==
- Gates of Cairo
- List of Historic Monuments in Cairo
