= Sidi Zouk Tomb =

Ancient tomb in Cairo, Egypt

- Arabic: ضريح سيدي الذوق
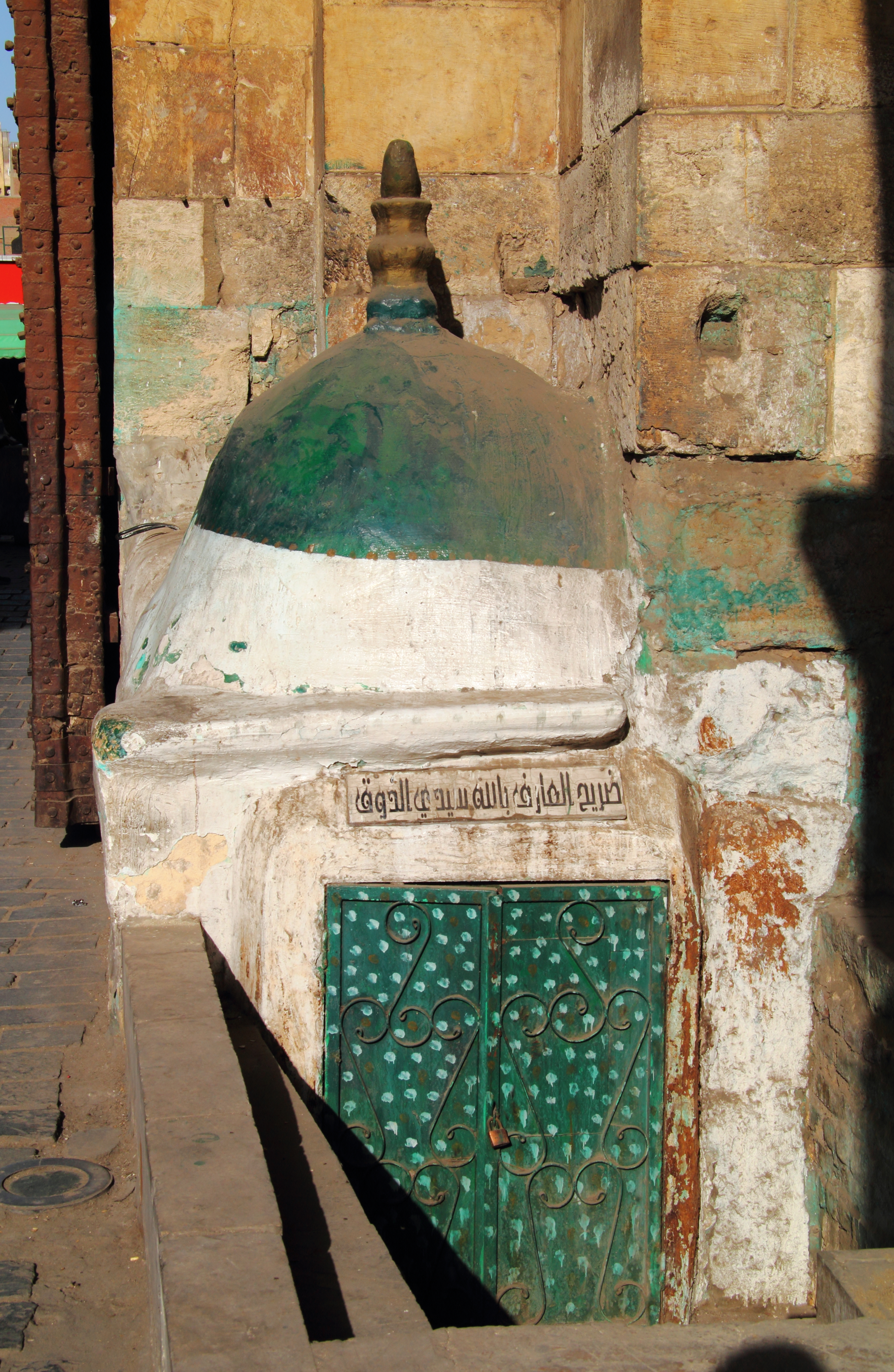

- Location in Egypt

Religion
- Affiliation: Islam

Location
- Location: Bab al-Futuh, Cairo, Egypt
- Interactive map of Sidi Zouk Tomb
- Coordinates: 30.0555570°N 31.2635420°E

The Sidi Zouk Tomb (Arabic: ضريح سيدي الذوق) is a small tomb located inside the Bab al-Futuh gate in Cairo, Egypt. It dates back to Mamluk period and has various stories and legends regarding the identity of the entombed. Most of the locals regard the tomb as sacred.

== Description ==
The whole tomb is made of concrete, and it has a wooden door for access inside to view the grave. The tomb has a concrete dome painted green, and on top of the dome is a crescent painted in gold. It is akin to the Green Dome of the Prophet's Mosque in Medina. A plaque stands above the door, which reads out "The shrine of Al-Arif Billah, Sidi Zouk".

== The legend of Sidi Zouk ==
=== First version ===
The first version of the legend relates that Sidi Hassan al-Zouk was a wise man beloved by his people. He often intervened to resolve disputes and usually succeeded. But one day he failed to solve a conflict and the dispute ended in a bloody brawl. Sidi Zouk decided to leave the village in protest but suddenly he collapsed and died. His followers buried him next to the village gate.

=== Second version ===
In the second version of this legend, Sidi Zouk was a merchant of Moroccan origin. He emigrated to Egypt and stayed there. Soon, he contracted a chronic illness. When his children asked for him to return to Morocco so that he could ultimately be buried in his homeland, he declined their offer. They instead forced him to travel to Morocco, so he set off on his journey, but he succumbed to his illness as soon as he stepped foot in the Bab al-Futuh gate.

=== Third version ===
The third version of this legend takes place in the Mamluk period. According to this account, Sidi Zouk was a government official. The Sultan complained about his government officials and threatened to imprison them. Feeling humiliated, Sidi Zouk decided to leave Egypt, but died just as he stepped foot into Bab al-Futuh.

== In popular culture ==
The phrase "taste will not leave Egypt" is a common Egyptian phrase, which originated from the legendary story of how death prevented Sidi Zouk from leaving Egypt.

== Controversy ==
In the 1940s, a 15-meter excavation was conducted under the tomb, but no human remains were found.

== See also ==
- Islam in Egypt
