= Historic Cairo Restoration Project =

Medieval islamic Cairo restoration project

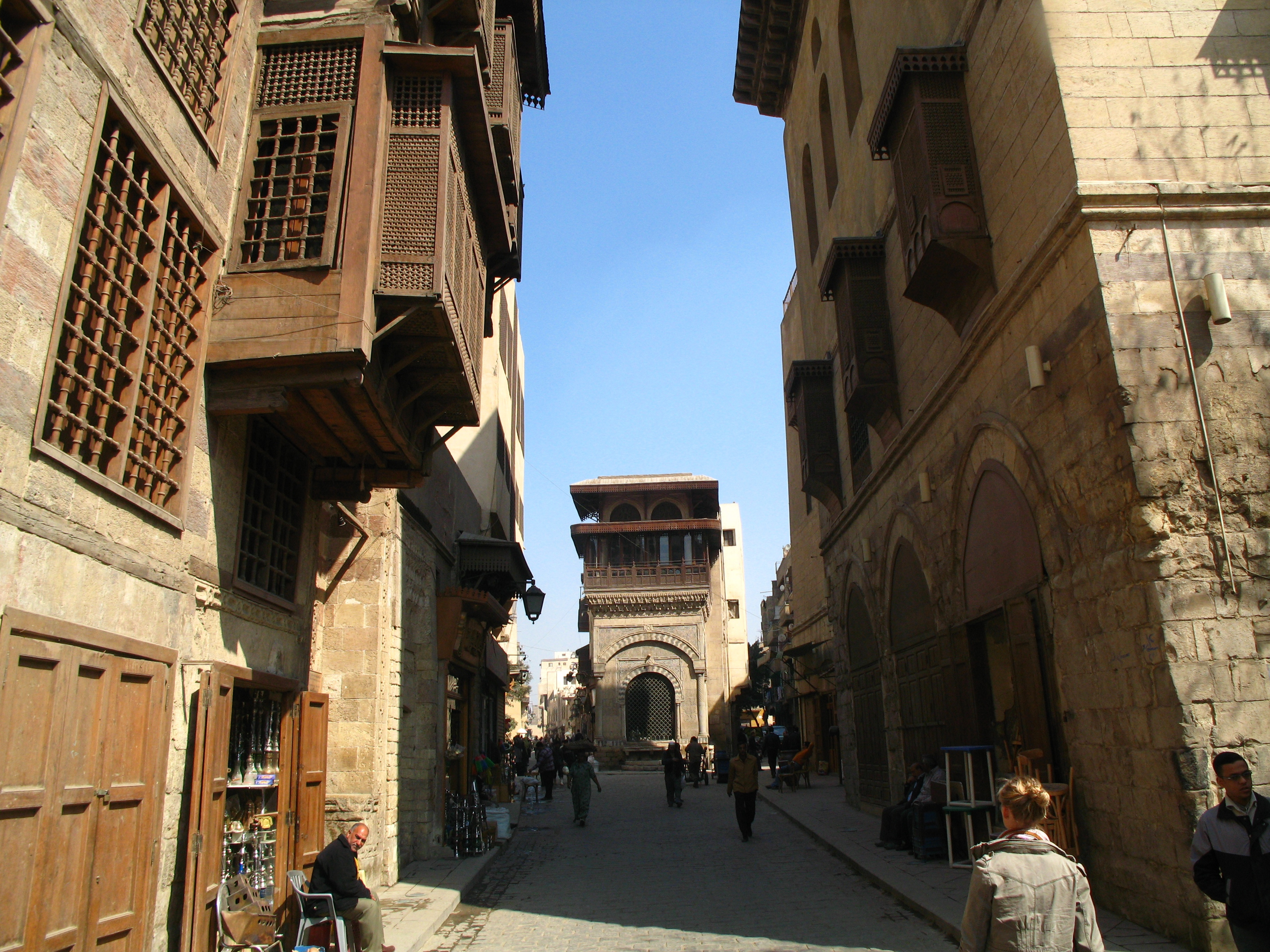
Present day view of Mamluk- and Ottoman-period monuments in the Fatimid era al-Qahira.

The Historic Cairo Restoration Project (HCRP) is an effort by the governments of Egypt and Cairo to restore and renovate historic Medieval Islamic Cairo. Al-Qahira (Cairo) was officially founded here in 969 CE by the Fatimid caliphs as an imperial capital and walled city, just to the north of the preceding capital Fustat. There are two parts to the HCRP: the remaking of the historic area and the restoration of its monuments.

== Concept ==
The Historic Cairo Restoration Project is a project started by the governments of Egypt and Cairo. The main project's intention is to create new museums in a sequence of historical sites in an open-air museum district, that will be widely accessible to both the citizens of Cairo and tourists. The project is currently focused on restoring historic landmarks from the medieval Fatimid era in Cairo (969 CE - 1250 CE). The number of potential historic monuments is estimated between 450 and 630 structures.

According to the Ministry of Culture, the HCRP plan is to "transform the whole area into an open-air museum." The HCRP is first focusing on this Islamic arts district in order to be a part of the Museum With No Frontiers. This is a museum organized by the European Union, and the Fatimid area project will be a part of its Euromed Heritage program — "Islamic Art in the Mediterranean."

=== Projects ===
A primary concept of the project is to feature the actual historical sites as the main exhibits for this open-air museum by providing extensive information resources and catalogs on-site at each of them. Visitors would therefore be able to truly experience medieval Egyptian culture and history by seeing the structures and sites while concurrently learning more about them from the on-site resources.

As a part of this project, to increase pedestrian accessibility there are plans to create a paved walkway along al-Muizz li-Din Allah, the main ceremonial path of Fatimid Cairo. There are also plans to demolish less significant adjacent vernacular structures to create large garden settings surrounding the landmarks.

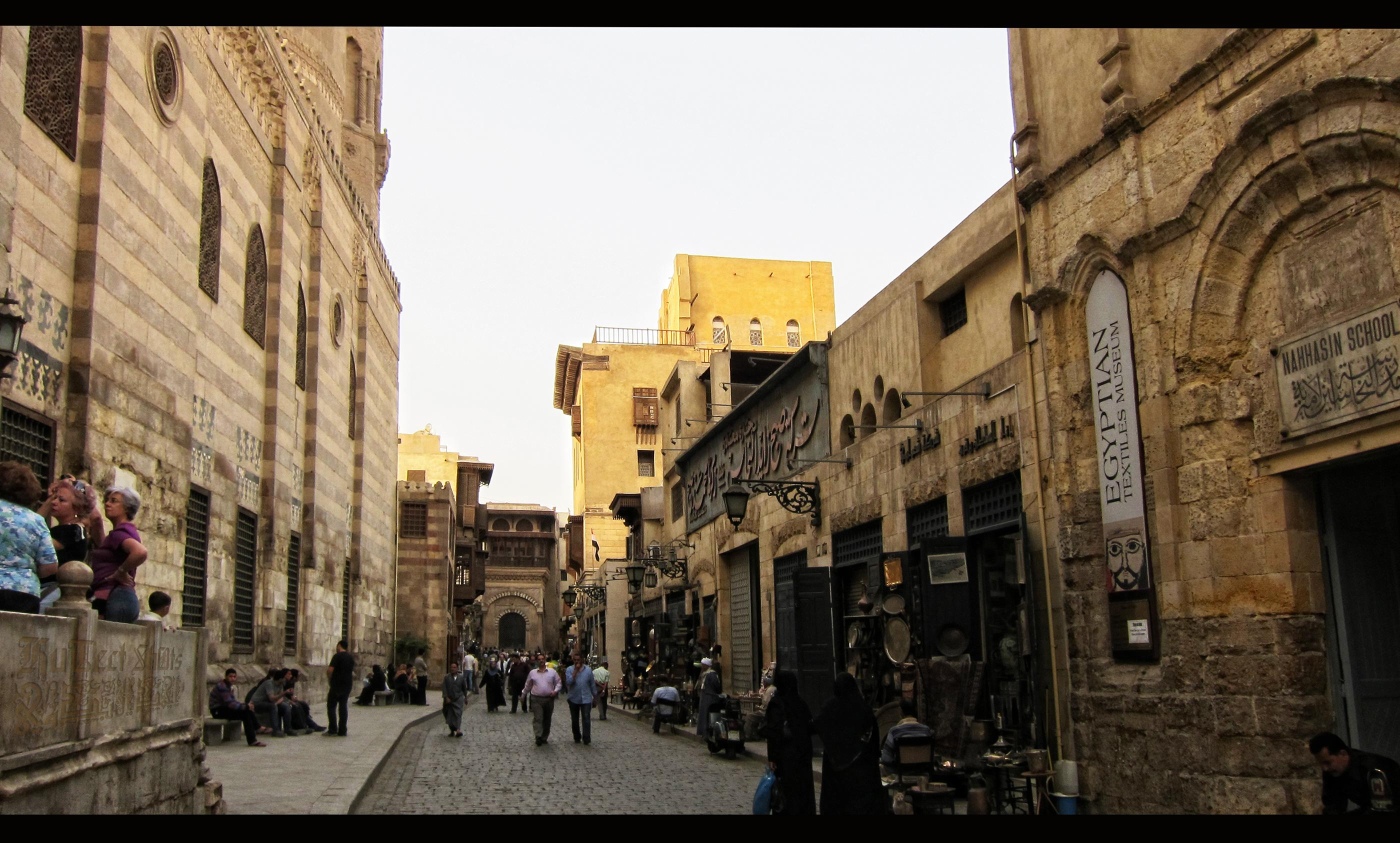
A section of the primary HCRP project site, al-Muizz li-Din Allah street and buildings.

== Criticisms ==
=== Medieval context ===
The HCRP has issued many plans, which have been met with resistance by some Cairens, the citizens of Cairo. For example, the plans to create gardens and walkways is seen by some as an assault on the original dense medieval layout and 'urban fabric' of Fatimid Cairo that diminishes the historical value of the retained sites.

The reasoning is that in Medieval Cairo, the context of a building was determined by its relationship to neighboring buildings. Buildings and monuments of importance were intentionally constructed adjacent to conventional ones, to convey and enhance their high stature and prestige. It is this urban clustering and juxtaposition that actually gives the landmark buildings authentic context and meaning for visitors to experience. Some Cairens think that by eliminating this context from the buildings the HCRP is lessening the value and historical understanding of their heritage sites.

Some architectural conservation experts have claimed the HCRP has used incorrect building materials in its conservation work. Other conservation experts counter that the massive and immediate intervention for landmarks, despite the inevitable mistakes, has stopped the threat of many just disappearing.

=== Funding ===
Some residents of historic Cairo have also become suspicious of the HCRP motives, questioning if the project really has historical preservation and interpretation as its true primary intention. Some believe that tourism and commerce are instead the main reason for the project's creation and funding. The large amount of spending necessary for the intended project has also become a point of controversy, with some estimates as high as $350 million. Some residents believe that the massive cost of creating the open-air museum and restoring its landmarks would be better spent for other local public social and economic needs.

== See also ==
- Al-Aqmar Mosque (Fatimid era mosque)
- Al-Muizz Street (within district)
- Islamic Cairo (the district, circa 10th—19th century city center)
- Old Cairo
