= Al-Azhar (disambiguation) =

Al-Azhar (Arabic: الأزهر al-azhar) is a mosque founded in Cairo.

It may also refer to:

- Al-Azhar Al Sharif, an Islamic scientific body and the largest religious institution in Egypt
- Al-Azhar University, a university in Cairo associated with the mosque
- Al-Azhar University – Gaza, an Islamic university in Gaza City, that follows Al-Azhar of Egypt
- Al-Azhar Great Mosque, mosque in Jakarta, Indonesia
- Al-Azhar Park, Cairo, Egypt
- Grand Imam of al-Azhar
- Education in Egypt § Al-Azhar system

== See also ==
- Azhar (disambiguation)
- Azhar (name)
- Azhari (name)
