= Azhar =

Azhar Kanika

- Azhar (name), an Arabic-origin name (including a list of persons with the name)
- Azhari (name), an Arabic-origin name (including a list of persons with the name)
- Azhar (film), a 2016 Indian biographical film about Indian cricketer Mohammad Azharuddin
- FC Azhar, were a Kazakhstani football club based in Kokshetau

== See also ==
- Al-Azhar (disambiguation)
- Azharite
