= Bab al-Barqiyya =

Historic gate in Cairo, Egypt

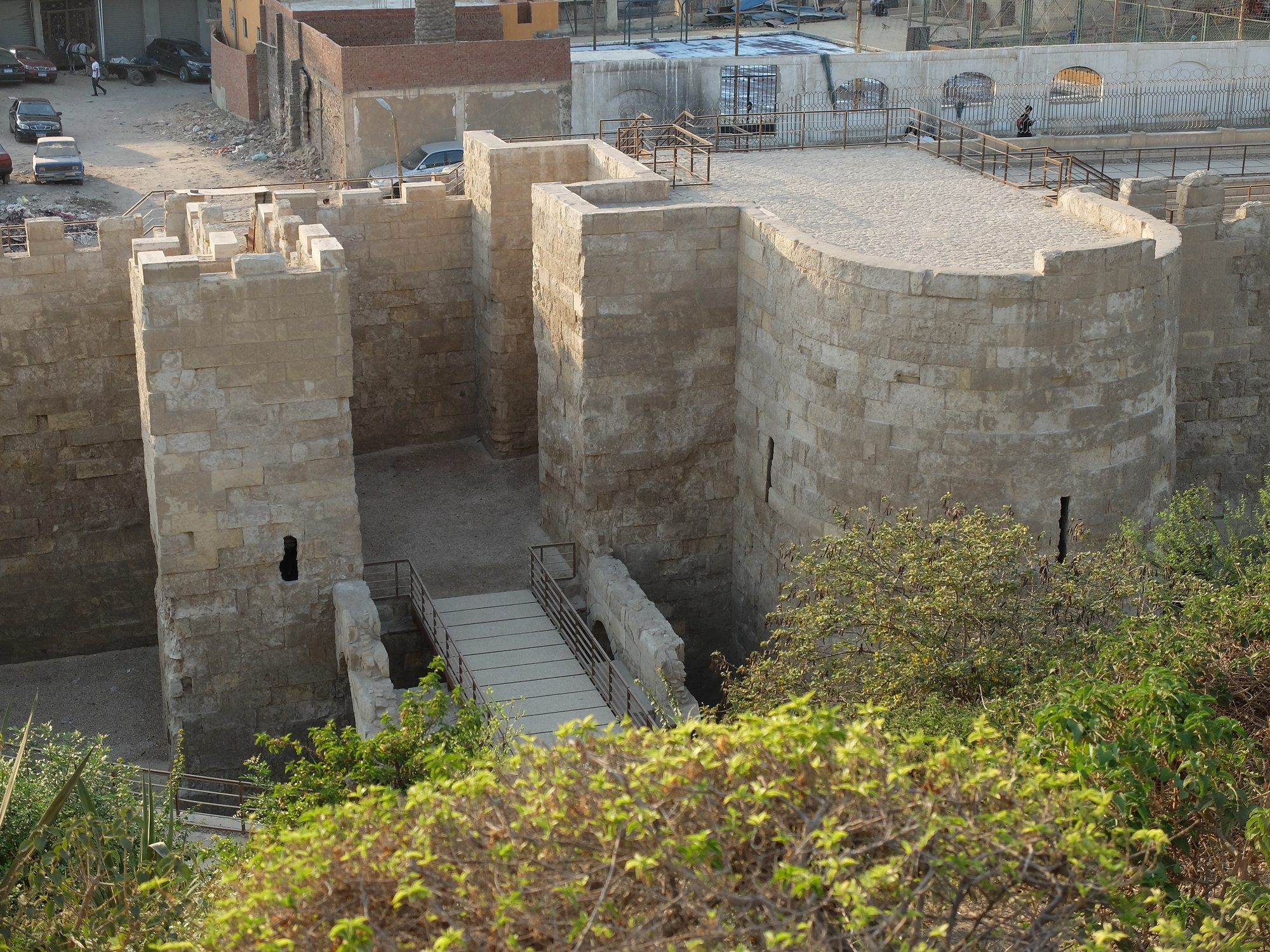
- Bab al-Barqiyya, seen from outside the walls, from al-Azhar Park.
- Alternative names: Bab al-Tawfiq

General information
- Type: Fortified city gate
- Architectural style: Ayyubid
- Location: Cairo, Egypt, Burg al-Zafar Street
- Coordinates: 30°2′36″N 31°15′54″E
- Completed: Between 1176 and early 13th century
- Renovated: 2000-2008

Bab al-Barqiyya (Arabic: باب البرقية) is a gate in the city walls of Cairo, Egypt. It acted as one of the main eastern city gates until falling into disuse and disappearing. In 1998, it was excavated and rediscovered, along with parts of the Ayyubid-era city walls of Cairo, as part of the creation of Al-Azhar Park.

It was restored in the 2000s in the process of the park's completion.

There is some uncertainty and confusion as to the historical name of the gate. It is possible that the name Bab al-Barqiyya was actually the name of another eastern gate further north, located where a Fatimid-era gate, Bab al-Tawfiq, has been unearthed. If true, then the Ayyubid gate described here was most likely the gate identified as Bab al-Jadid ("New Gate") by historical writers such as al-Maqrizi, a name that in modern times also corresponds to another gate located in the northeast corner of the historic city.

== History ==
Bab al-Barqiyya was originally an eastern gate in the walls of Cairo that were built by the Fatimids during their foundation of the city in the 10th century. This gate, along with the other gates of that time, subsequently disappeared. The gate was rebuilt by Badr al-Gamali, the vizier under the Fatimid caliph al-Mustansir, as part of his reconstruction of the walls of Cairo in the 11th century. The present-day gates of Bab al-Futuh, Bab al-Nasr, and Bab Zuweila also date from this time.

Archeological excavations have also unearthed another gate from this time, named Bab al-Tawfiq ("Gate of Success") according to an inscription panel found on it. It is possible that the name Bab al-Barqiyya actually corresponded to this gate, which would have thus replaced the earlier Fatimid gate of the same name.

Under the Ayyubid sultan Salah ad-Din (Saladin), the Fatimid walls and gates were restored in 1171. In 1176, Salah ad-Din then began a project to radically expand the city's fortifications. This project included the construction of the Citadel of Cairo and a 20 kilometer-long wall to connect and protect both Cairo (referring to the former royal city of the Fatimid caliphs) and Fustat (the main city and earlier capital of Egypt a short distance to the southwest). The entirety of the envisioned course of the wall was never quite completed, but long stretches of the wall were built, including the section to the north of the Citadel and a section near Fustat in the south. Following this work, three eastern gates of the city are recorded by historical sources such as al-Maqrizi: Bab al-Barqiyya, Bab al-Mahruq ("Burned Gate") and Bab al-Jadid ("New Gate").

Bab al-Barqiyya was thus one of the main eastern gates of the city. Outside it was a desert area which was initially used by the Mamluks for equestrian games, a tradition started by Baybars and ended in 1320 by al-Nasir Muhammad. Later on, during the Burji Mamluk period, this area was the site of new Mamluk mausoleum complexes, now known as the Northern Cemetery. In the meantime, however, the city's growth and the relative security of the region made Bab al-Barqiyya's function as defensive gate less and less important. The gate, and the city walls around it, fell into disuse and the inhabitants of the city built new houses and structures into them or on top of them. Over time, the eastern edge of the city, where the walls once stood, became a dumping ground for the city's detritus. The walls and gates disappeared under a growing mound of debris, though they remained largely intact.

In the late 1990s and early 2000s, the rubbish hills east of the historic city were excavated and transformed by the Aga Khan Trust for Culture into al-Azhar Park, which opened in 2005. The gate and parts of the Ayyubid wall were first uncovered during this work in 1998. A joint French-Egyptian archeological investigation took place after this, starting in 2000 and lasting four years. The gate, first uncovered in 1998, has been identified as Bab al-Barqiyya; but this identification has been debated. It is possible that it actually corresponds to the gate identified by al-Maqrizi as Bab al-Jadid. The gate, now restored, stands on the western edge of Al-Azhar Park. Another nearby Ayyubid gate located further south, Bab al-Mahruq, was also transformed into the western entrance to the park from the Darb al-Ahmar neighbourhood.

== Description ==
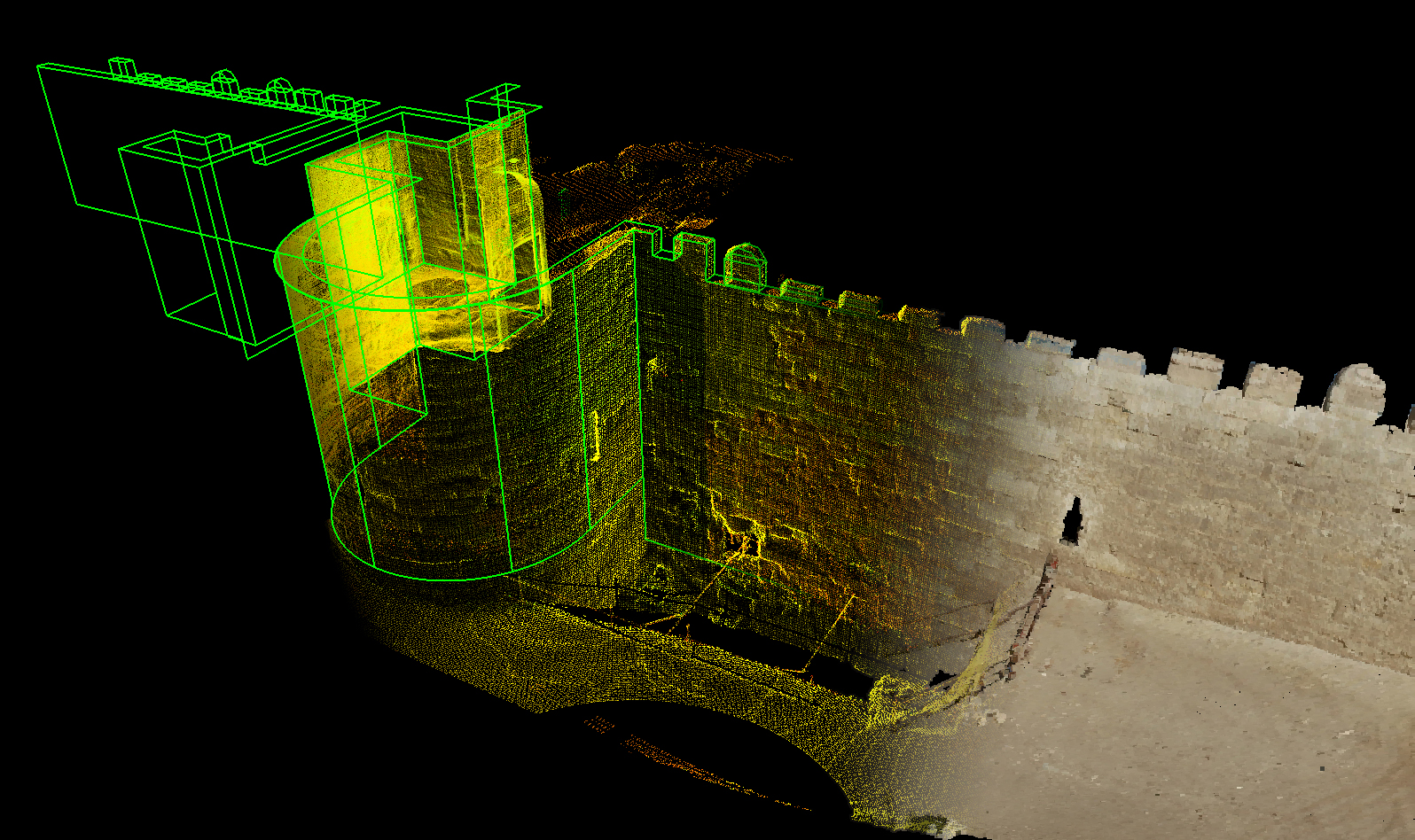
Isometric laser scan data image of the Bab al-Barqiyya gate. This fortified gate was constructed with interlocking volumes that surrounded the entrance in such a way as to provide greater security and control.

The gate, built in stone, had a complex design typical of Middle-Eastern medieval fortified gates known as a "bent entrance". Rather than a simple opening in the walls where traffic goes straight through, the gate forces traffic to pass sideways through the gate by making two 90-degree turns in and out of the gate. This design was intended to impede direct assaults and force any attackers to slow down as they entered the gate.
