= Fortifications of Cairo =

Historic military architecture in Cairo, Egypt

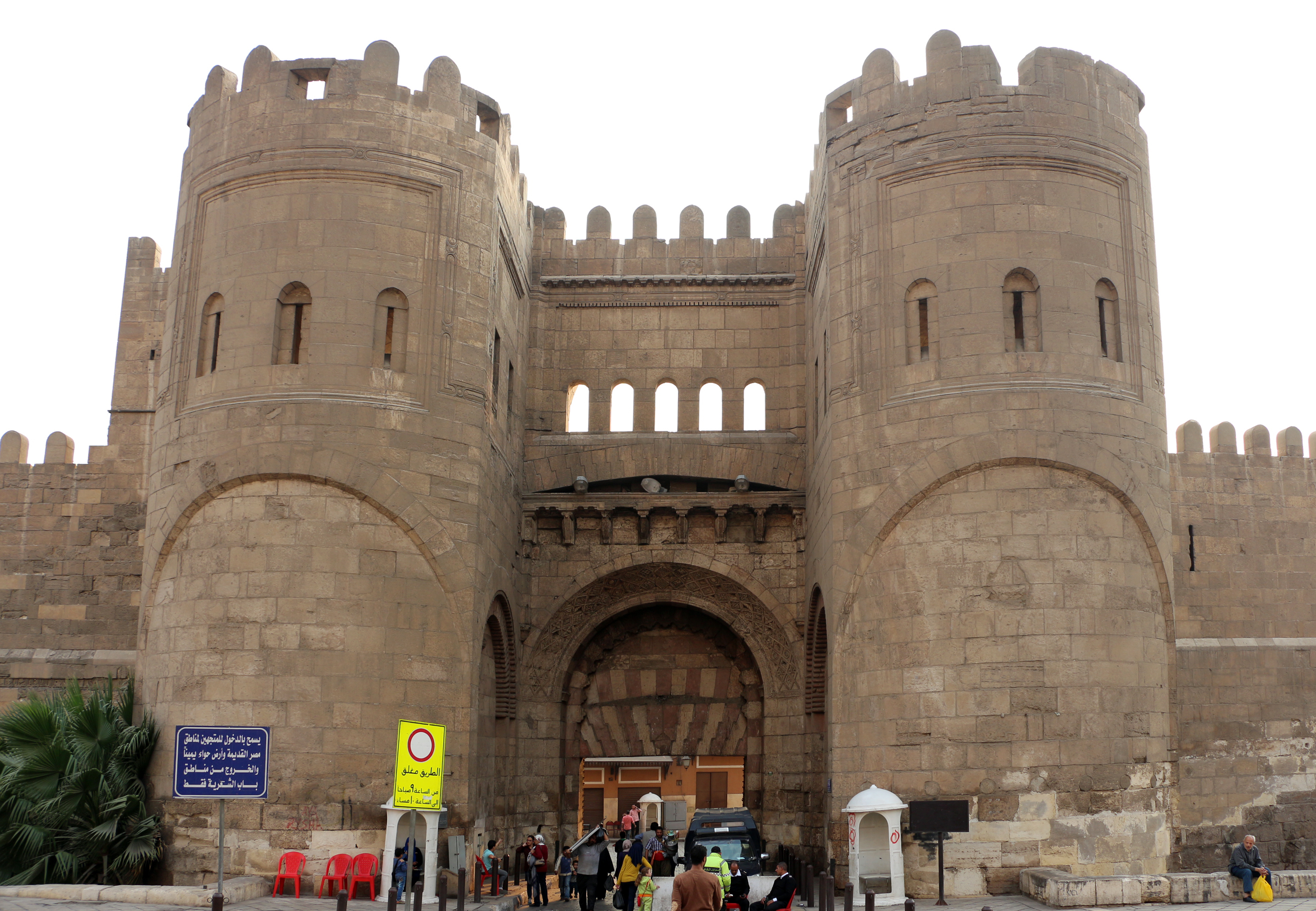
Bab al-Futuh, one of the two preserved Fatimid gates in the northern city walls, dated to 1087

The fortifications of the historic city of Cairo, Egypt, include defensive walls and gates that were built, rebuilt, and expanded in different periods.

The first set of walls was built during the foundation of Fatimid Cairo in the 10th century. These were rebuilt in the late 11th century on the orders of the Fatimid vizier Badr al-Jamali. In the 12th century, the Ayyubid sultan Salah ad-Din (Saladin) restored the walls and began a major extension to the south. He also began construction on the Citadel of Cairo, a military complex that would serve as the center of power in Egypt for centuries afterwards.

Some sections of the historic walls are still preserved today, mainly on the north and east sides of the city, as well as much of the Citadel. Only three gates are fully preserved, all dating from the late 11th-century Fatimid reconstruction: Bab al-Nasr, Bab al-Futuh, and Bab Zuwayla. Some other gates have been partially recovered through archeological excavations, such as Bab al-Barqiyya.

== Historical development ==
=== Fatimid walls ===
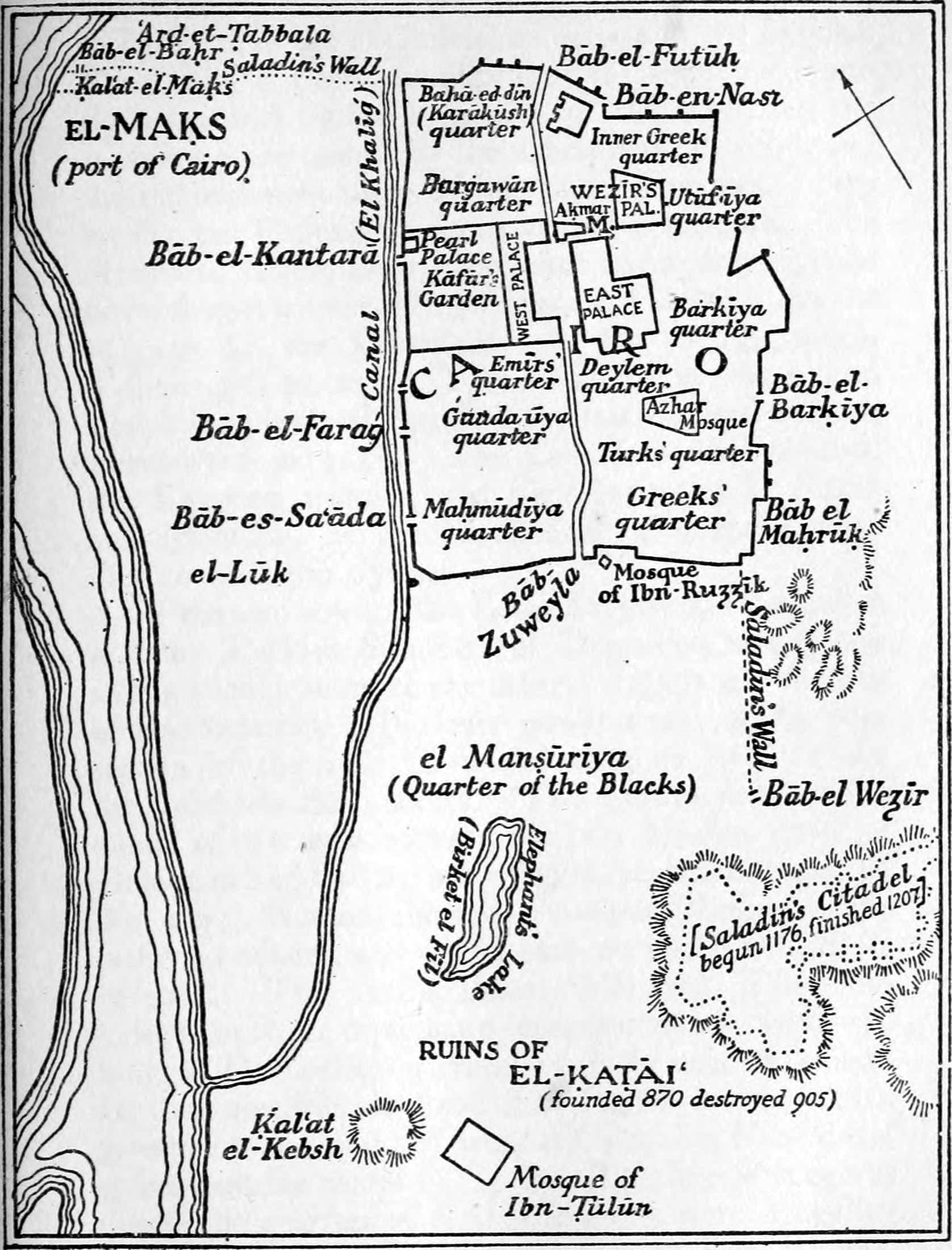
Plan of Fatimid Cairo according to Stanley Lane-Poole, showing the city wall and the known gates

Cairo was founded as a palace-city in 969 by the Fatimid Caliphate. Jawhar al-Siqilli, the Fatimid general who led the conquest of Egypt, oversaw the construction of the city's original walls, which were built of mudbrick. According to later medieval sources, these first city walls, which had a roughly rectangular outline, had eight gates. On the north side were two gates named Bāb al-Futūḥ ("Gate of Conquests") and Bāb al-Naṣr ("Gate of Victory"); on the east side were Bāb al-Barqiyya ("Gate of the Barqa regiment") and Bāb al-Qarrātīn ("Gate of the clover merchants"); to the south were Bāb Zuwayla ("Gate of the Zuwayla") and Bāb al-Faraj ("Gate of Joy"); and on the west side were Bāb al-Qanṭara ("Gate of the bridge [over the Khalij canal]") and Bāb al-Sa'ada ("Gate of Felicity"). During the Fatimid period there were many gardens along the walls. A chain of gardens ran past Bab al-Nasr and the garden of al-Mukhtar al-Saqlabi existed outside Bab al-Futuh.

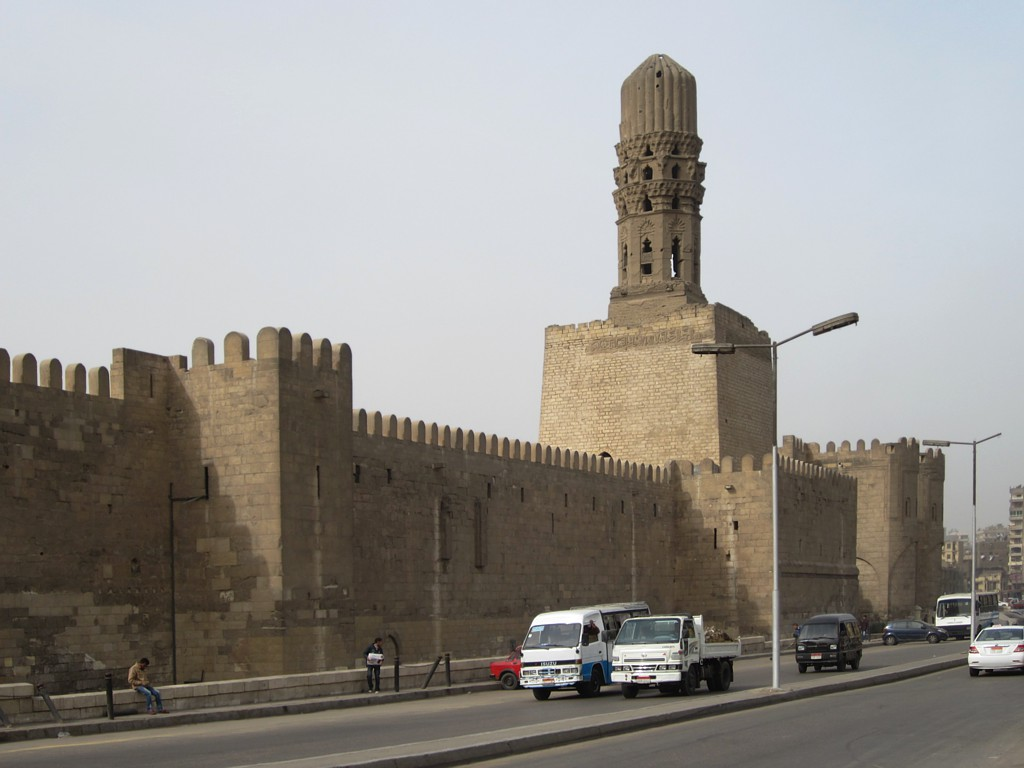
Northern section of the city walls between Bab al-Nasr and Bab al-Futuh, dating from the late 11th century Fatimid reconstruction

During the late 11th century, the Fatimid vizier Badr al-Jamali ordered a reconstruction of the walls primarily out of stone and further outward than before to expand the space within Cairo's walls. Construction began in 1087. The architectural elements of the walls were informed by Badr al-Gamali's Armenian background, and were innovative in the context of Islamic military architecture in Egypt. The walls are composed of three vertical levels. The lower level was elevated above the street and contained the vestibules of the gates, which were accessible by ramps. The second level contained halls that connected different galleries and rooms. The third level was the terrace level, protected by parapets, where, near gates, belvederes were built for the caliph and his court to use. Although it was previously thought that the entirety of Badr al-Jamali's walls were built in stone, more recent archeological findings have confirmed that at least part of the eastern wall was built out of mudbrick, while the gates were built in stone. The gates of the new walls retained generally the same names and were located in the same areas as those of the old walls.

=== Ayyubid walls ===
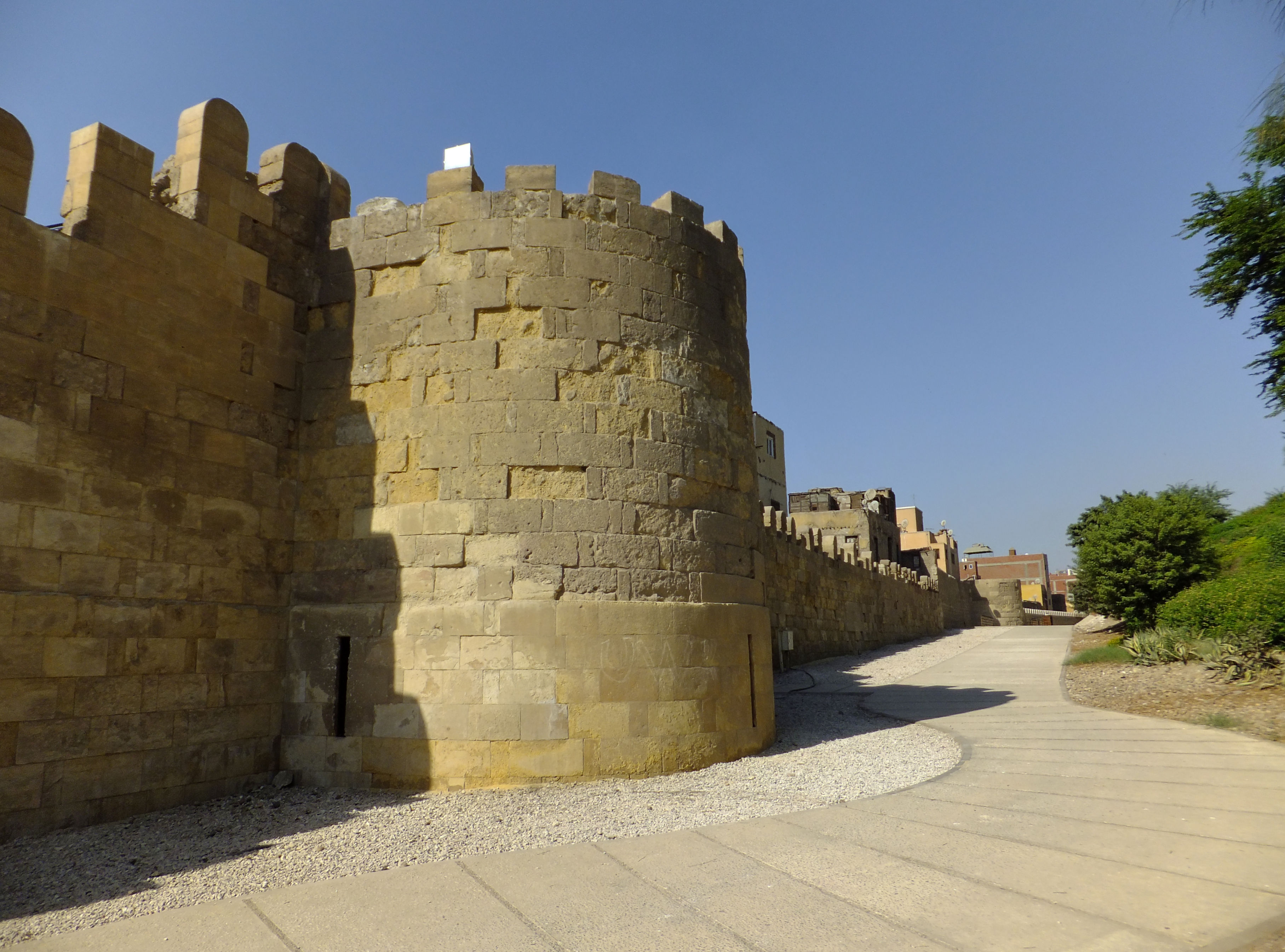
Part of the eastern city wall, dating from the Ayyubid period (12th–13th centuries) and excavated in the last few decades (as seen from al-Azhar Park)

Salah ad-Din, the founder of the Ayyubid dynasty, restored the Fatimid walls and gates in 1170 or 1171. He reconstructed parts of the walls, including the eastern wall. In 1176, he then embarked on a project to radically expand the city's fortifications. This project included the construction of the Citadel of Cairo and of a 20 kilometer-long wall to connect and protect both Cairo (referring to the former royal city of the Fatimids) and Fustat (the main city and earlier capital of Egypt a short distance to the southwest). The entirety of the envisioned course of the wall was never quite completed, but long stretches of the wall were built, including the section to the north of the Citadel and a section near Fustat in south. Work continued under subsequent Ayyubid sultans.

Al-Maqrizi, a writer from the later Mamluk period, reports several details about the construction. In 1185–6, the wall around Fustat was being built. In 1192, a trench was being built for the eastern fortifications, by which time some of the eastern wall and its towers were probably in place. Work continued after Salah ad-Din's death (1193) under his successors, al-'Adil and al-Kamil. In 1200, orders went out to dig the remaining course of the wall. More sections of the wall were completed by 1218, but by 1238 work was apparently still ongoing.

The new Ayyubid extensions also added several new gates, of which eight have been identified. The northern extension of the wall, running west from Bab al-Futuh, added two new gates in this area: Bāb al-Sharī'ah ("Gate of the Law [Sharia]"), located close to the Fatimid walls, and Bāb al-Baḥr ("Gate of the Sea/Water"), located further west and close to the Nile River. The eastern walls near Cairo (north of the Citadel) included, from north to south: Bāb al-Jadīd ("New Gate"), Bāb al-Barqiyya, and Bāb al-Mahrūq ("Burned Gate"). The new section of walls near Fustat (south of the Citadel) included, from north to south: Bāb al-Qarāfa ("Gate of the Cemetery [al-Qarafa]") and Bāb al-Safā.

=== Modern restorations and excavations ===
Since 1999, the preserved northern section of Fatimid walls has been cleared of debris and part of a local urban regeneration. In the late 1990s and early 2000s, the rubbish hills east of the historic city were excavated and transformed by the Aga Khan Trust for Culture into al-Azhar Park, which opened in 2005. Parts of the Ayyubid wall and a gate were uncovered in 1998, during this work. Further archeological work and restoration has since taken place in this area.

== Preserved gates ==
Many gates existed along the walls of Fatimid Cairo, but only three remain today: Bab al-Nasr, Bab al-Futuh, and Bab Zuwayla (with "Bab" translating to "gate"). These gates are among the most important masterpieces of historic military architecture in the Islamic world.A restoration project from 2001 to 2003 successfully restored the three gates and parts of the northern wall between Bab al-Nasr and Bab al-Futuh.

=== Bab al-Futuh and Bab al-Nasr (northern gates) ===
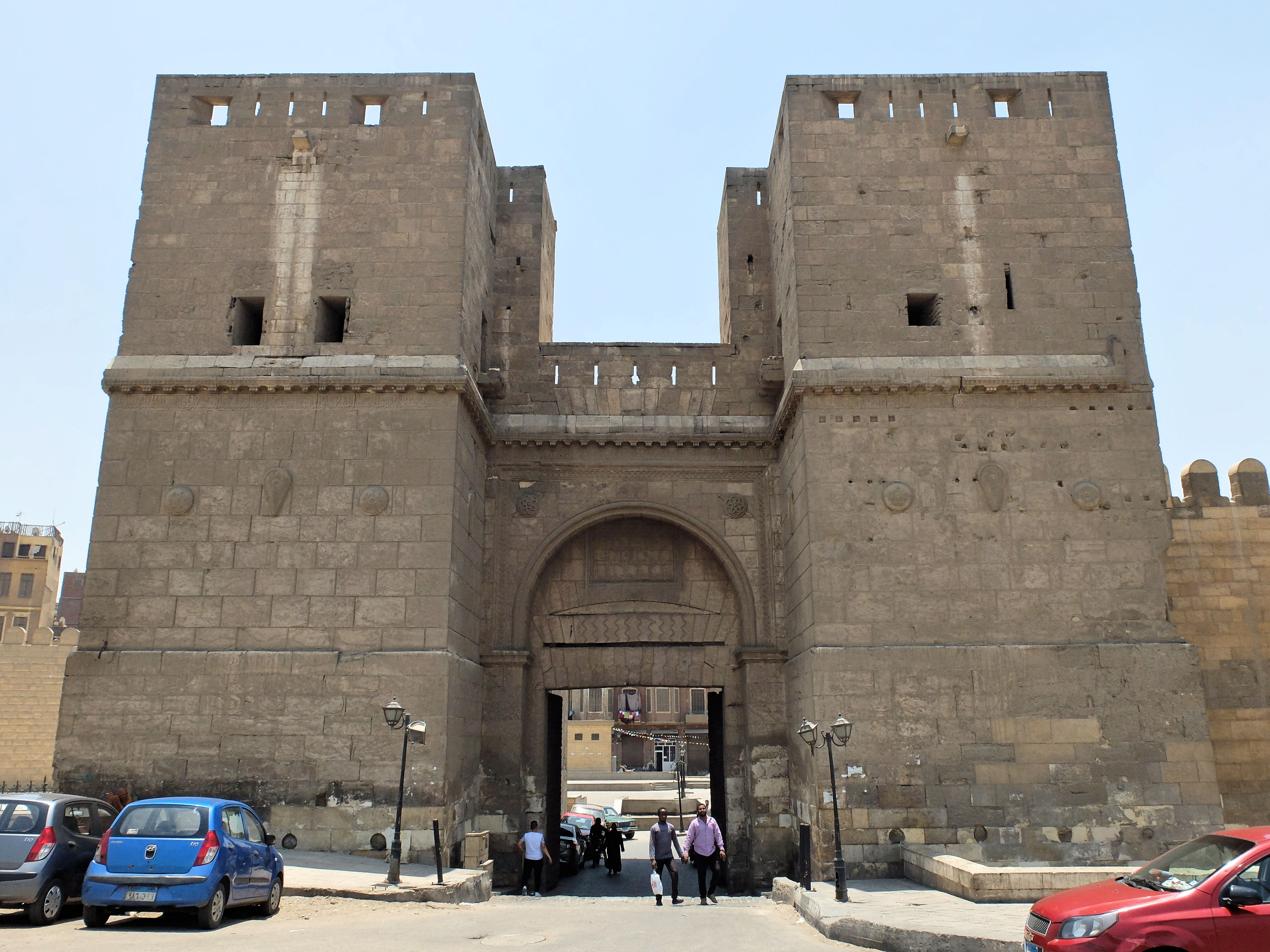
Bab al-Nasr, one of the northern city gates in the Fatimid walls, dated to 1087

Bab al-Nasr and Bab al-Futuh are both are on the northern section of the wall, about two hundred yards from each other. Bab al-Nasr, which translates to "the Gate of Victory," was originally called Bab al-Izz, meaning "the Gate of Glory," when constructed by Gawhar al-Siqilli. It was reconstructed by Badr al-Gamali between 1087 and 1092 about two hundred meters from the original site and was given its new name. Similarly, Bab al-Futuh was originally called Bab al-Iqbal, or "the Gate of Prosperity," and was later renamed Bab al-Futuh by Badr al-Gamali.

Bab al-Nasr is flanked by two towers of square shape, with shield insignias carved into the stone, while Bab al-Futuh is flanked by round towers. The vaulted stone ceilings inside Bab al-Nasr are innovative in design, with the helicoidal vaults being the first of their kind in this architectural context. The façade of Bab al-Nasr has a frieze containing Kufic inscriptions in white marble, including a foundation inscription and the Shi'a version of the Shahada which was representative of the Fatimid caliphate's religious beliefs.

Bab al-Futuh features no inscriptions on the gate itself, but an inscription can be seen nearby to the east, on the wall salient around the northern minaret of the al-Hakim Mosque. Inside Bab al-Futuh, through its eastern flanking doorway, is the tomb of an unidentified figure, and through its western flanking doorway is a long vaulted chamber.

=== Bab Zuwayla (southern gate) ===
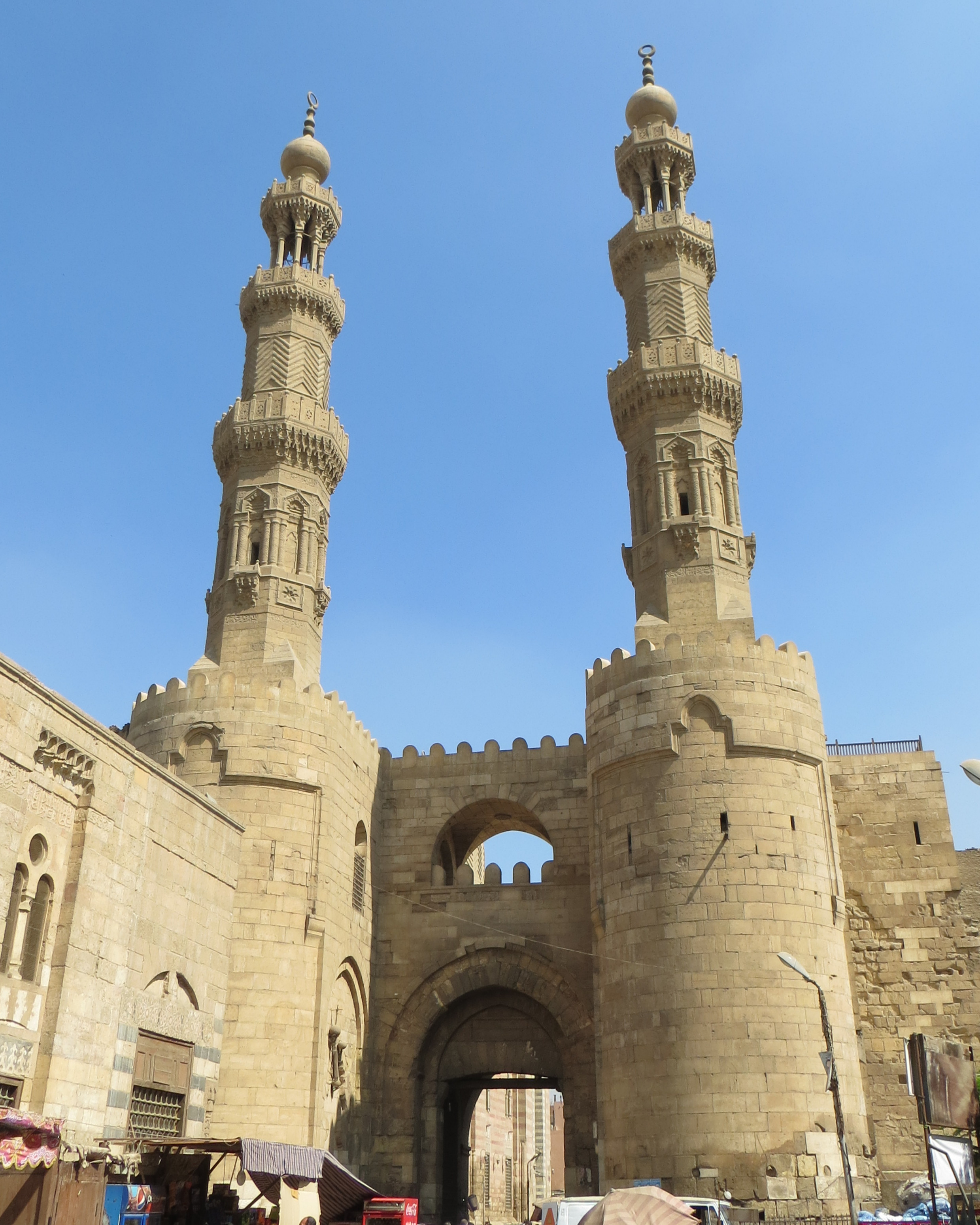
Bab Zuwayla, the southern gate of the Fatimid walls, dated to 1092

The third surviving gate, Bab Zuwayla, sits in the southern section of the wall. Badr al-Gamali rebuilt Bab Zuwayla further south than Gawhar al-Siqilli's original gate. The construction of the current gate is dated to 1092. Similar to Bab al-Nasr and Bab al-Futuh, Bab Zuwayla was also adjacent to gardens, namely the gardens of Qanṭara al-Kharq. The Mosque of al-Mu'ayyad Shaykh was built next to the gate between 1415 and 1420, at which time a pair of minarets were constructed on top of the two bastions that flank the gateway.

=== Eastern gates ===
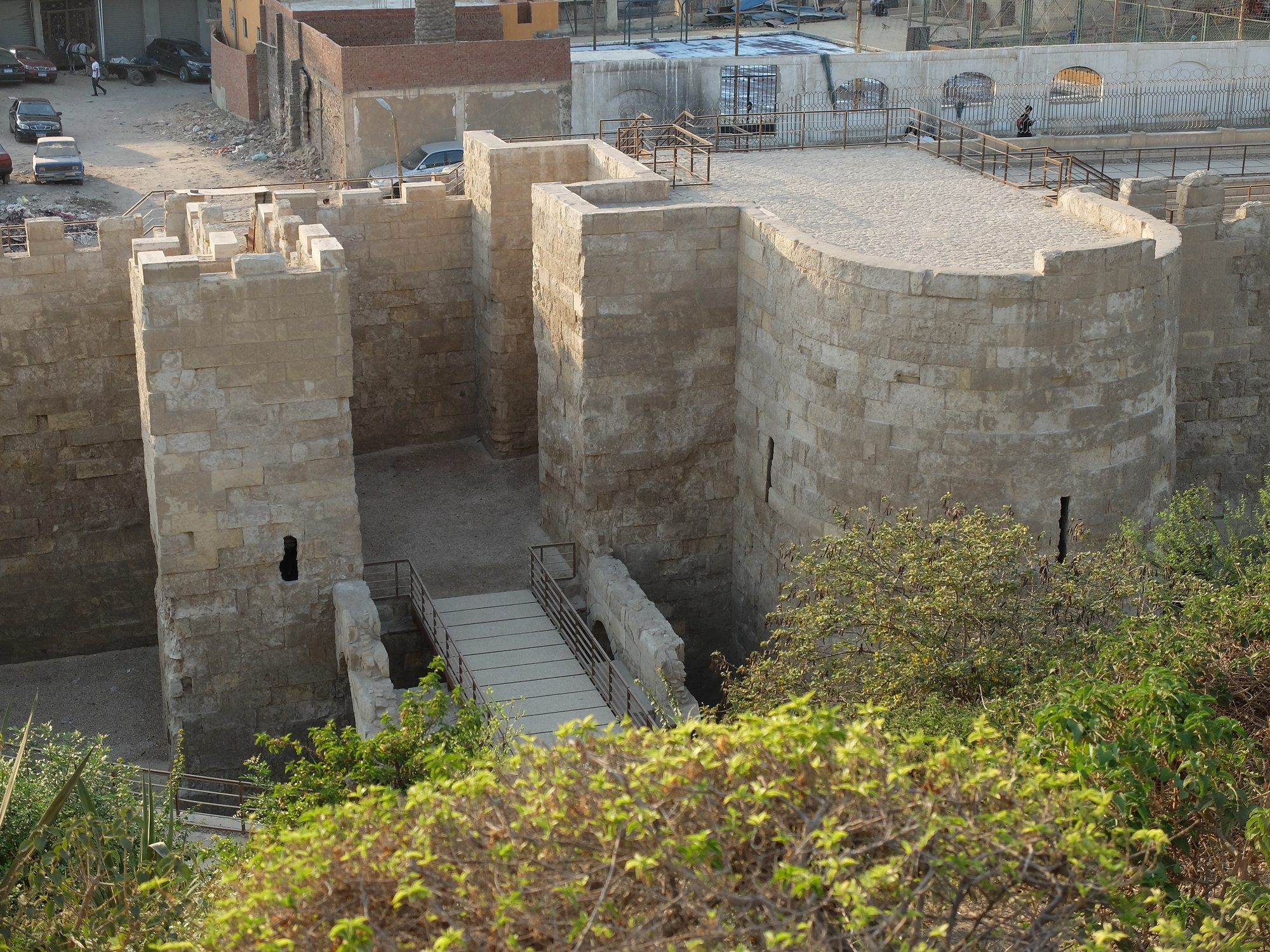
Bab al-Barqiyya (possibly the historic Bab al-Jadid), an Ayyubid gate rediscovered during excavations in 1998

One of the eastern gates of the city, part of the Ayyubid reconstruction of the walls, was also uncovered in 1998 and subsequently studied and restored. It has a complex defensive layout including a bent entrance and a bridge over a moat or ditch. Initially identified as Bab al-Barqiyya, it is possible that it was actually known as Bab al-Jadid ("New Gate"), one of the three eastern gates mentioned by al-Maqrizi. If so, then the name Bab al-Barqiyya most likely corresponded to another gate a short distance to the northeast. The latter gate, originally discovered in the 1950s, dates from Badr al-Gamali's time and, according to an inscription, was also called Bab al-Tawfiq ("Gate of Success"). It would have replaced the earlier 10th-century Fatimid gate in this area. Archeologists discovered a number of ancient stones with Pharaonic inscriptions that were re-used in the gate's construction. It was likely replaced by an Ayyubid-era gate built in front of it, but as of 2008 this had not yet been excavated.

Another gate further north, near the northeast corner of the walls, was known as Bab al-Jadid up to the present day and thus possibly contributed to confusion over the identification of the Ayyubid gate uncovered in 1998, with which it shares a similar layout.

== Citadel ==
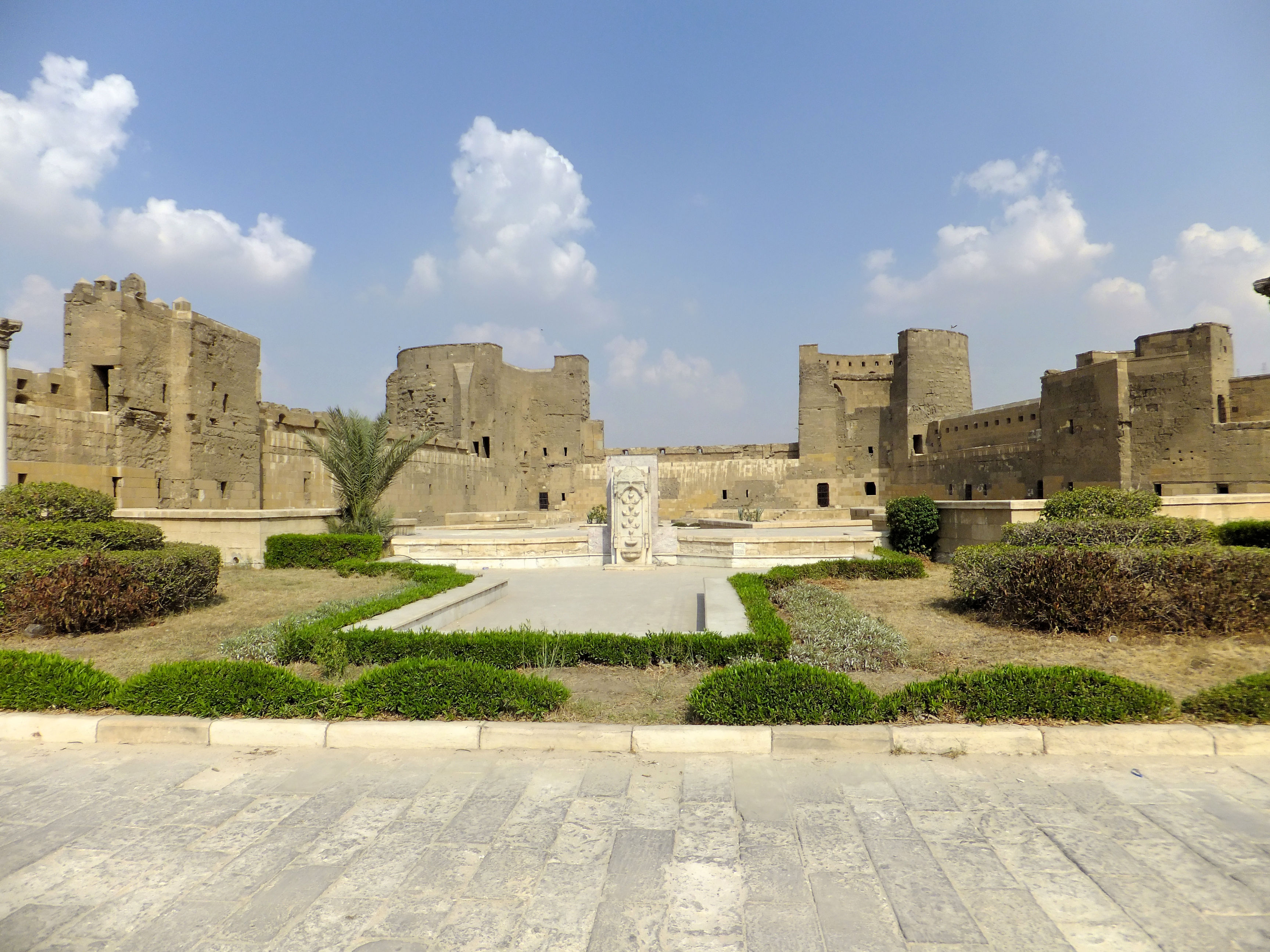
Inside the northern enclosure of the Cairo Citadel, whose walls still largely date from the Ayyubid period (late 12th and early 13th centuries). Other parts of the Citadel were repeatedly modified in later periods.

In 1176, the construction of the Cairo Citadel began under Saladin's orders. It was to become the center of government in Egypt until the 19th century, with expansions and renovations. The Citadel was completed under sultan Al-Kamil (r. 1218–1238). All of al-Kamil's fortifications can be identified by their embossed, rusticated masonry, whereas Saladin's towers have smooth dressed stones. This heavier rustic style became a common feature in other Ayyubid fortifications. As the Citadel remained the center of government for Egypt for centuries, it underwent multiple renovations and expansions, notably in the Mamluk period (13th to early 16th centuries) and under the rule of Muhammad Ali Pasha.
