= Azhari (name) =

Azhari (Arabic أزهري) or with the article -al as in al-Azhari (Arabic الأزهري, literally belonging to Azhar) is a common surname. It may refer to:

== Azhari ==
- Abdul Ghani Azhari (1922–2023), Indian Muslim scholar and historian
- Aidul Fitriciada Azhari (born 1968), Indonesian judicial administrator
- Akhtar Raza Khan Azhari (1943–2018), also known as Tajushshari'ah or Azhari Miya, an Indian Barelvi Muslim scholar
- Ayu Azhari (born 1967), Indonesian actress and author
- Che Husna Azhari (born 1955), Malaysian writer of literature
- Gholam Reza Azhari (1912–2001), Iranian military leader and Prime Minister of Iran
- Khaled Azhari (born 1966), Egyptian politician and government minister
- Sarah Azhari (born 1978), Indonesian actress, model and singer
- Yasmina Azhari, Syrian businesswoman
- Osama al-Azhari, Egyptian preacher

== Al-Azhari ==
- Abu Mansur al-Azhari (895–980)
- Abdullah Quraishi Al-Azhari (1935–2015), Indian Islamic scholar
- Ahmed Saad Al-Azhari, Egyptian British Islamic scholar
- Ismail al-Azhari (1900–1969), Sudanese nationalist and political figure
- Muhammad Karam Shah al-Azhari (1918–1998), Pakistani Islamic scholar associated with Barelvi movement

== See also ==
- Azhar (name)
