= Bab al-Nasr (Cairo) =

Historic city gate in Cairo, Egypt

Coordinates: 30°03′15″N 31°15′53″E

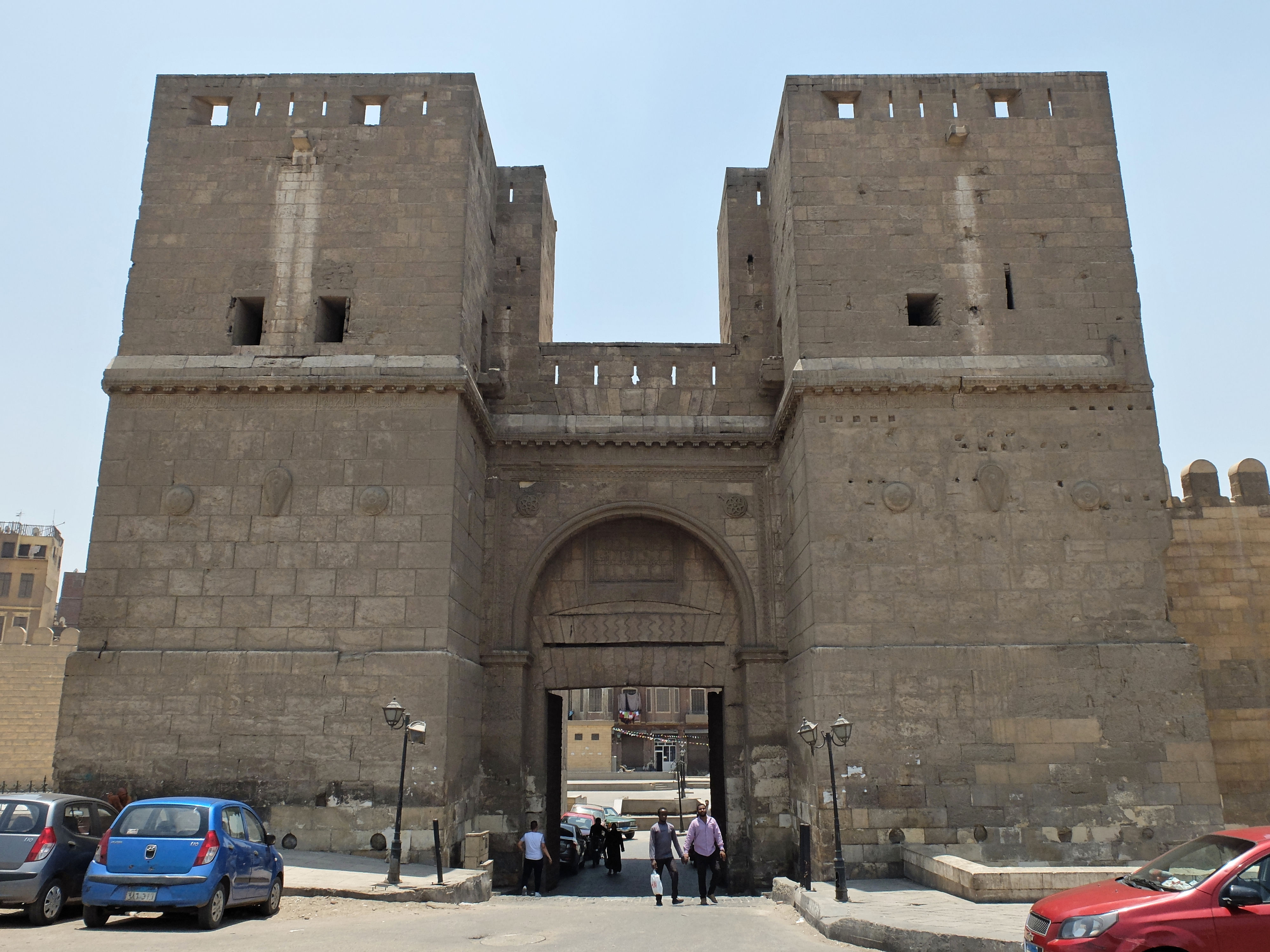
The outer façade of the gate

Bab al-Nasr (Arabic: باب النصر, lit. 'Gate of Victory'), is one of three remaining gates in the historic city wall of Cairo, the capital of Egypt. The gate's construction is dated to 1087 and was ordered by Badr al-Jamali, a Fatimid vizier. It is located at the northern end of Shari'a al-Gamaliya (al-Gamaliya Street) in the old city of Cairo and slightly east of another contemporary gate, Bab al-Futuh.

== History ==
The original Bab al-Nasr was built south of the present one by Fatimid general Jawhar as-Siqilli during the reign of the Fatimid caliph al-Mu'izz, when the city was first laid out in 969. Later, the vizier Badr al-Jamali, under Caliph al-Mustansir, enlarged the city and rebuilt the walls in the late 11th century. He replaced the first gate with the present one, naming it Bab al-'Izz ('Gate of Prosperity'). Despite this, the inhabitants have shown preference to the original name meaning "Gate of Victory", which has remained in use to this day. An inscription on the gate dates its construction to the year 1087 AD (480 AH).

Napoleon later named each tower of the north wall after the officers responsible for its security. The names of these French officers are carved near the upper level of the gates, like for example that of Thomas-Prosper Julien, aide-de-camp of Bonaparte in Egypt. The east tower is known as Tour Courbin and the west tower is known as Tour Julien.

Historical images of the gate

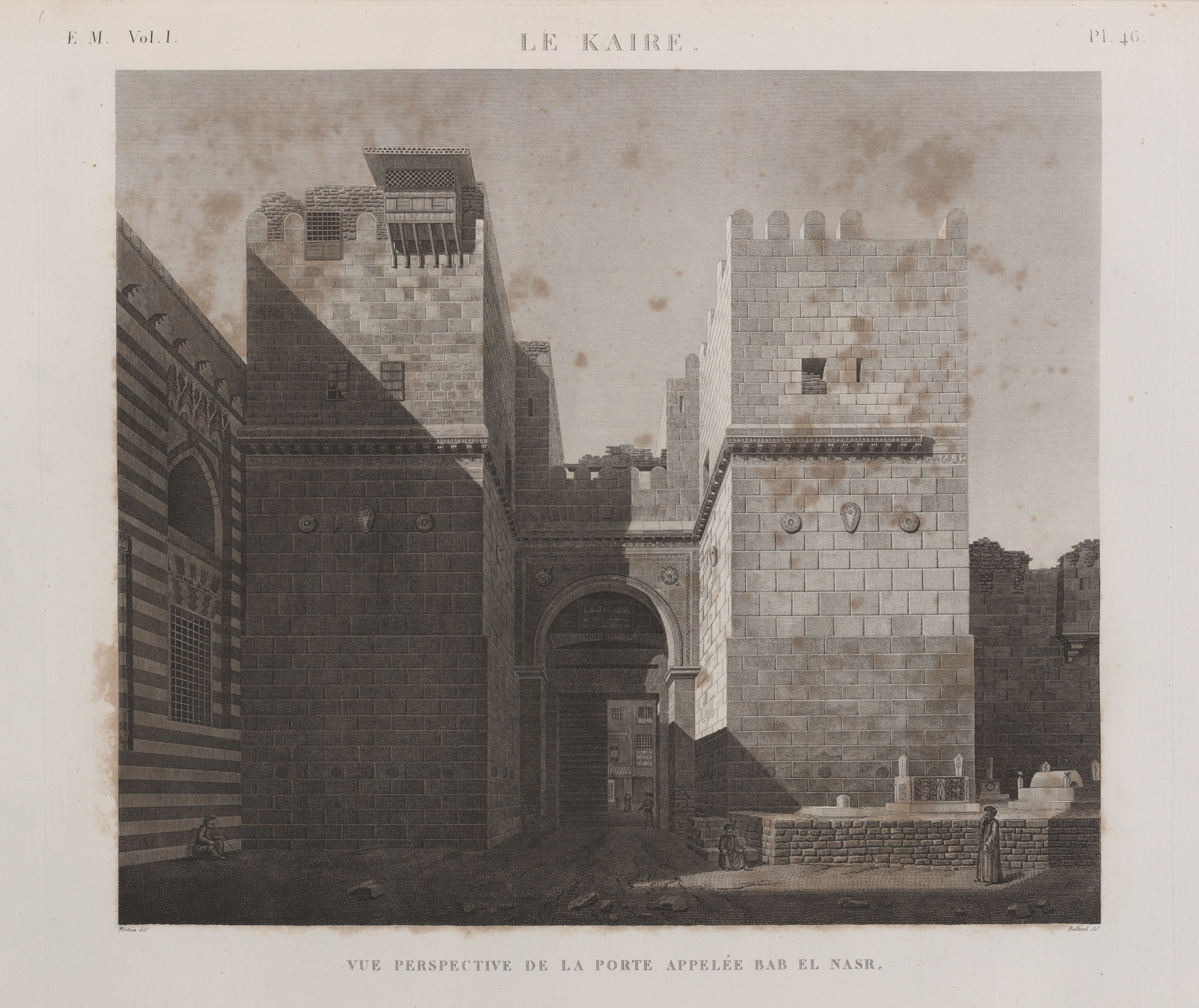
Illustration of the gate in the Description de l'Égypte, circa 1800

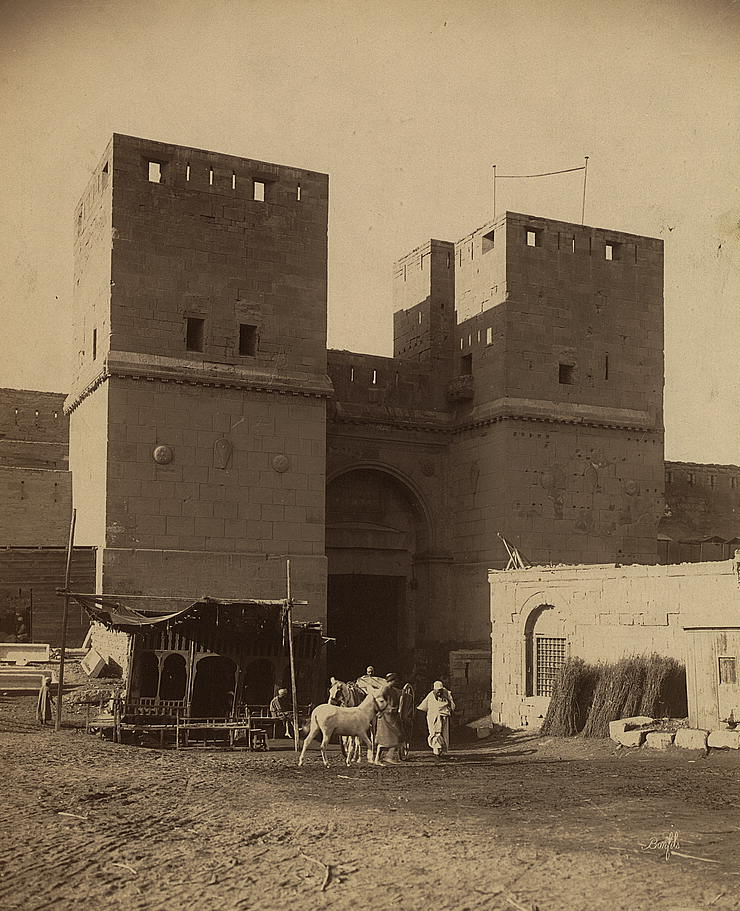
Photograph of the gate in 1867

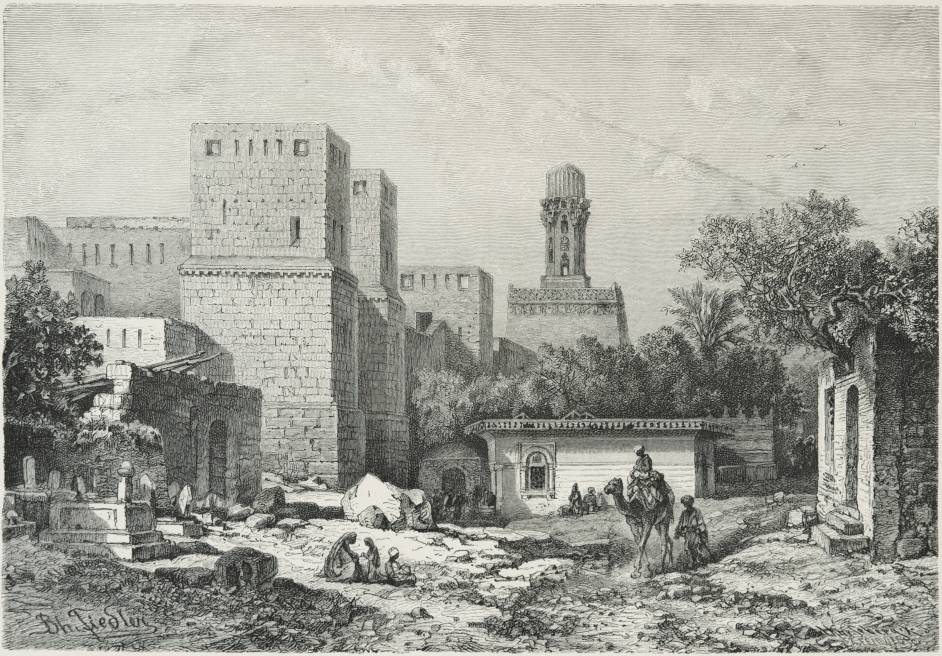
Drawing of the gate and its surroundings in 1878

== Design ==
It is a massive fortified gate with rectangular stone towers flanking the semicircular arch of the eastern portal. The gate and the surrounding wall were carefully designed for defense. Arrow slits allowed defenders to shoot projectiles at enemies below and projecting towers made it possible to deliver flanking fire as well. Inside the walls and towers were guard rooms and living quarters, connected by vaulted passages. The vaulted stone ceilings inside the gate were innovative in design, in particular the helicoidal vaults of the stairways, which are the oldest of their kind in this architectural context.

Views of the gate

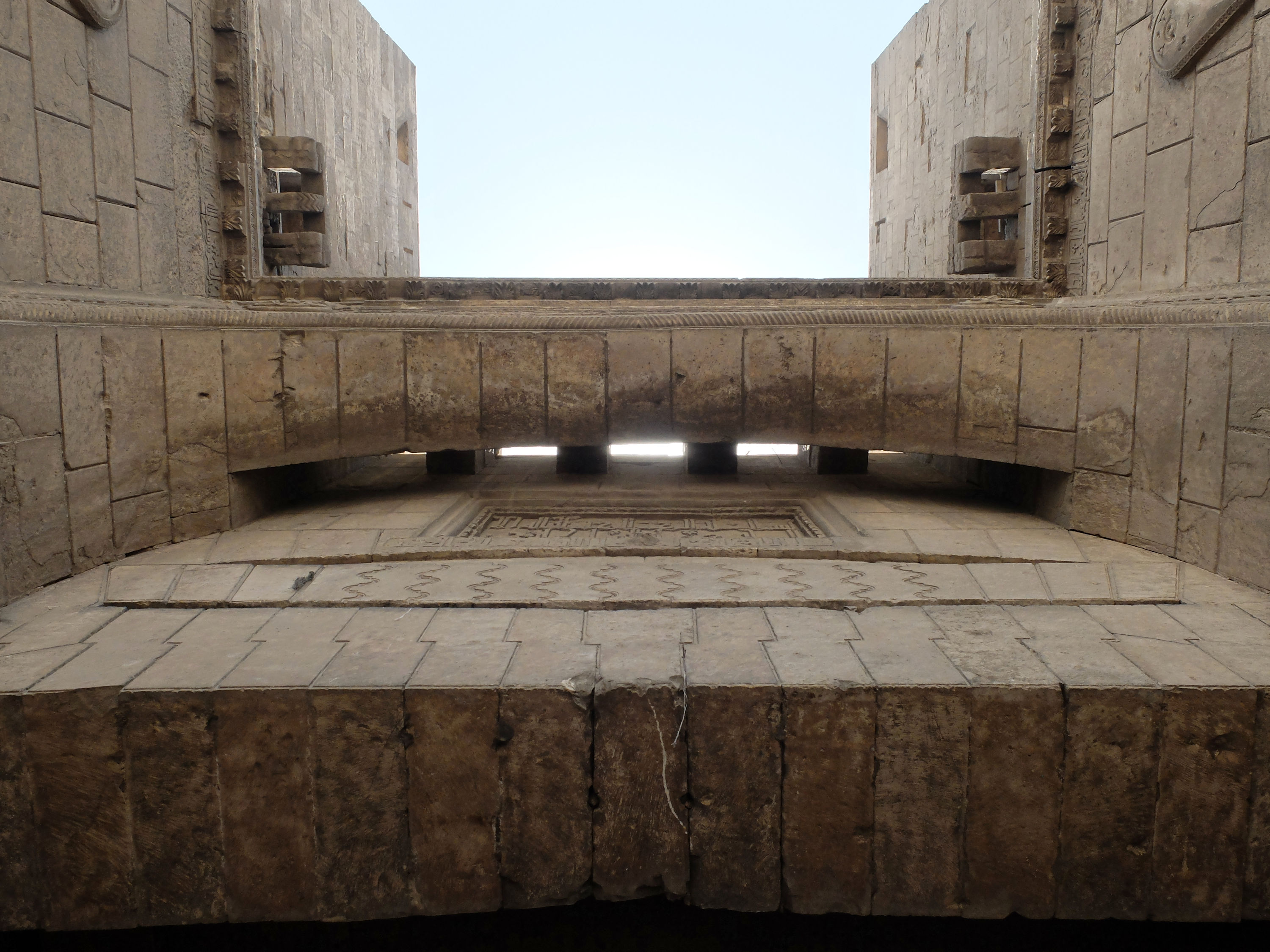
View under the arch of the gate

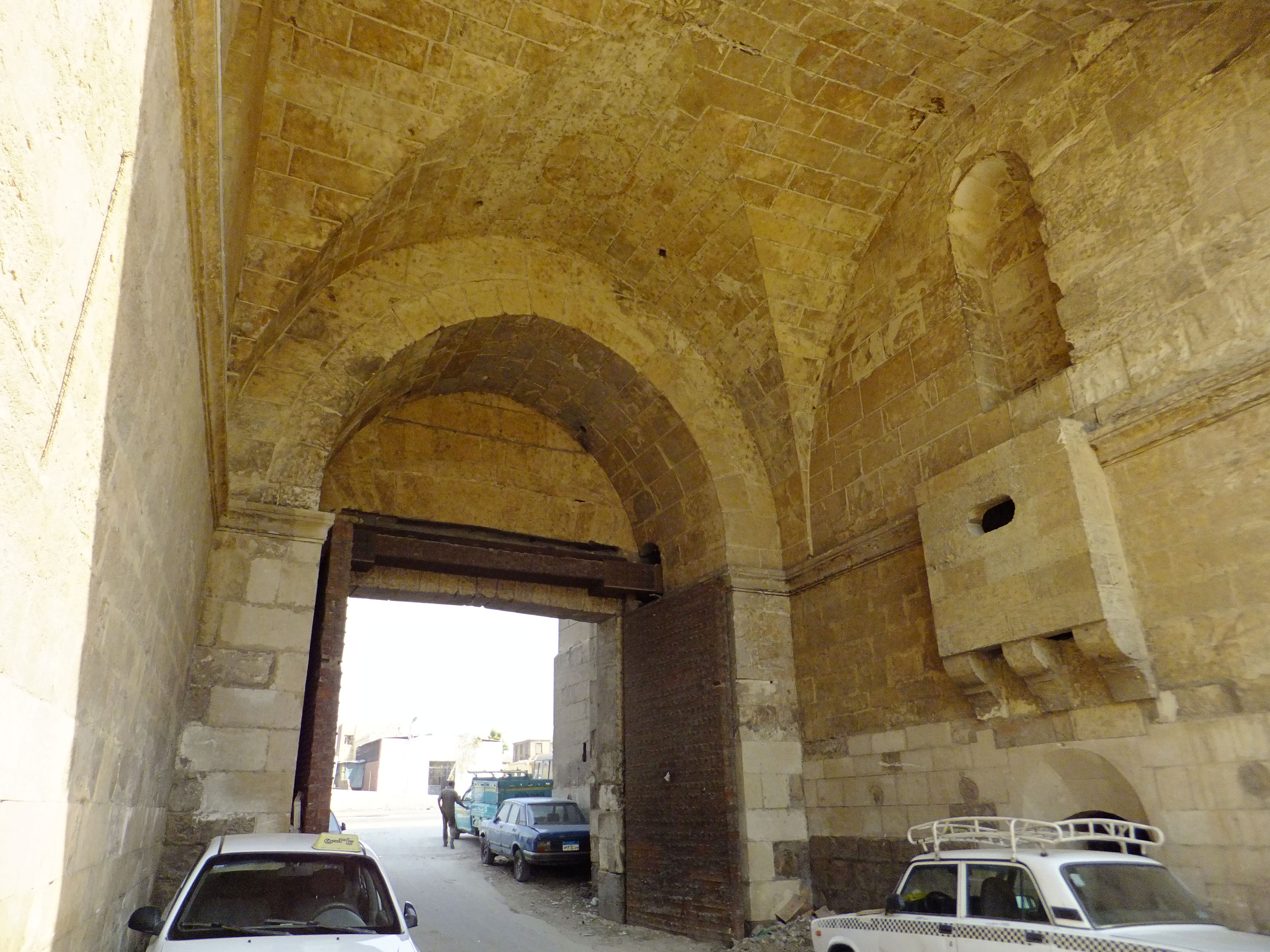
Interior passage of the gate

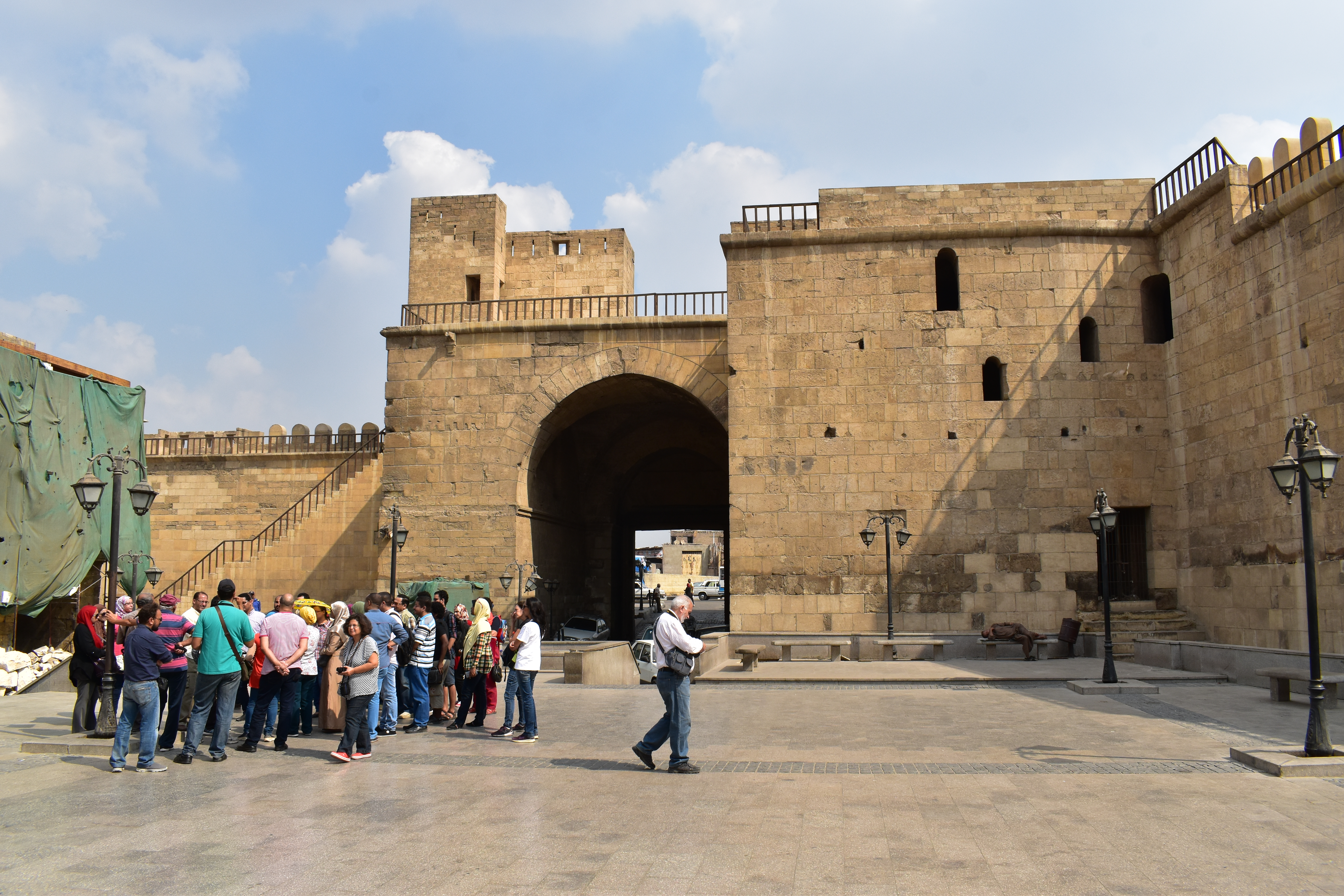
View of the southern side of the gate, inside the city walls

A significant decorative feature is the shields on the flanks and fronts of the protruding towers, which symbolize victory in protecting the city against invaders. A long horizontal Arabic inscription that runs across the facade of the gate, above the shield motifs, names Badr al-Jamali and his caliph, al-Mustansir, and also gives the date of construction. The bulk of the inscription praises Badr al-Jamali in particular. The full inscription, translated from Arabic, reads:

In the name of God ... by the power of Allah, the Powerful and Strong, Islam is protected, fortresses and walls rise up. This Gate of Power (Bab al-'Izz) and the wall, protecting the city of al-Mu'izz, Cairo, the safe-guarded – may God protect it – were raised by the slave of our sovereign and master, the Imam al-Mustansir Billah, Amir al-Mu'minin – may the benedictions of God be upon him, his ancestors the unblemished imams, and his noble descendants. The most noble lord, the commander-in-chief, the sword of Islam, the defender of the imam, the guardian of the judges of the Muslims, and the one who guides the missionaries of the believers, Abu'l-Najm Badr al-Mustansiri, may God support the true religion through him and grant enjoyment to the Amir al-Mu'minin by prolonging his [Badr's] life, and make his power endure and elevate his speech, [for] he it is by whose excellent administration God has strengthened the state and [her] subjects whose uprightness has embraced [both] the elite and the populace [i.e. everybody], seeking the reward of God and His approval and asking for His generosity and beneficence, and the safeguarding of the throne of the caliphate, and praying to God that He may surround him with His favors. This work was begun in Muharram of the year 480 [April–May 1087].

A rectangular inscription panel above the arch of the gate contains a Shi'a version of the Shahada, claiming Fatimid belief in Muhammad as prophet and Ali as imam. The full inscription reads:

In the name of God... there is no God but Allah, He has no partners [and] Muhammad the messenger of God, 'Ali the companion of God. May God be pleased with them and with all the imams who are their descendants.

Decoration of the gate

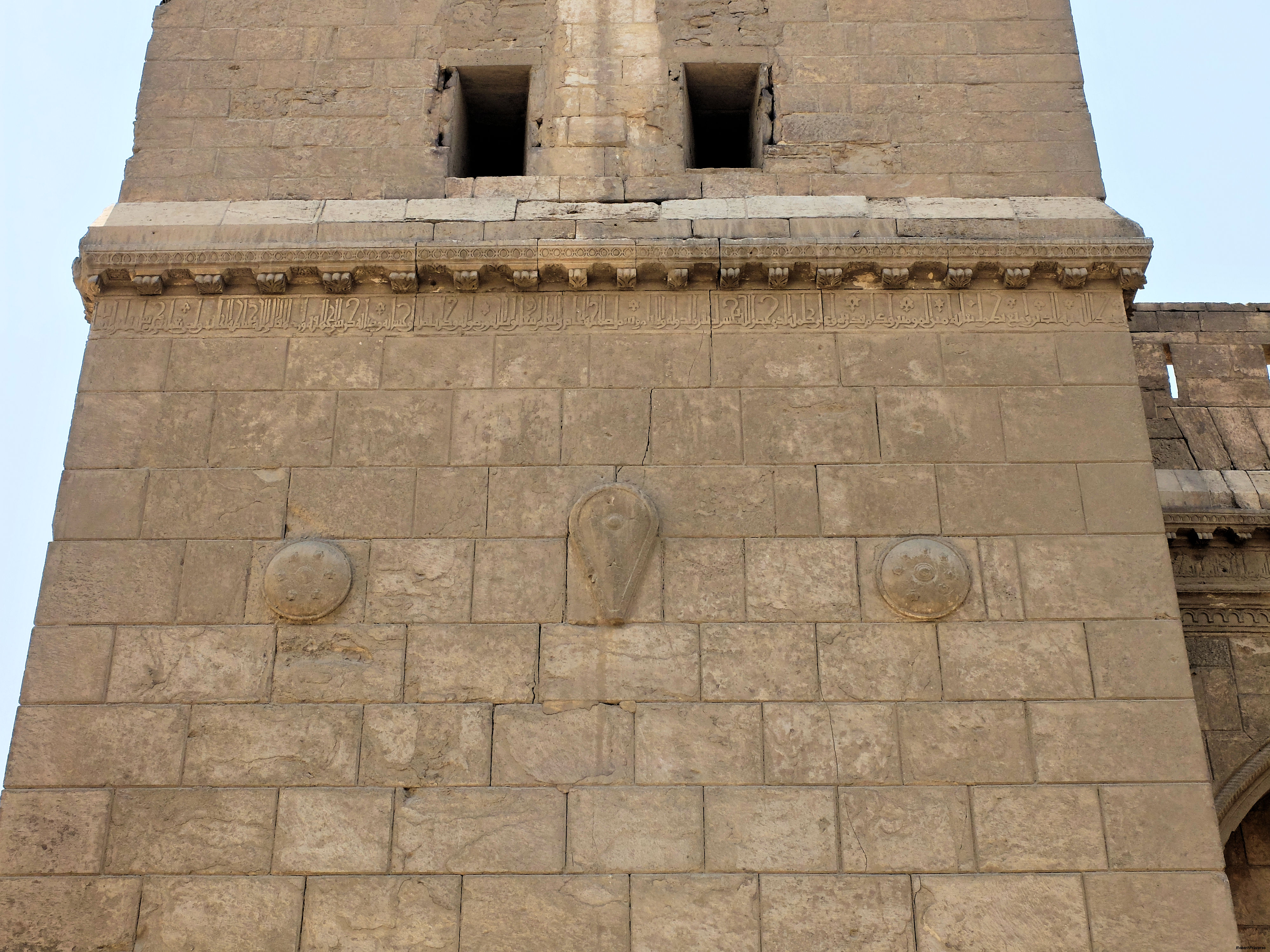
View of the eastern tower, with carved shield motifs and inscription above

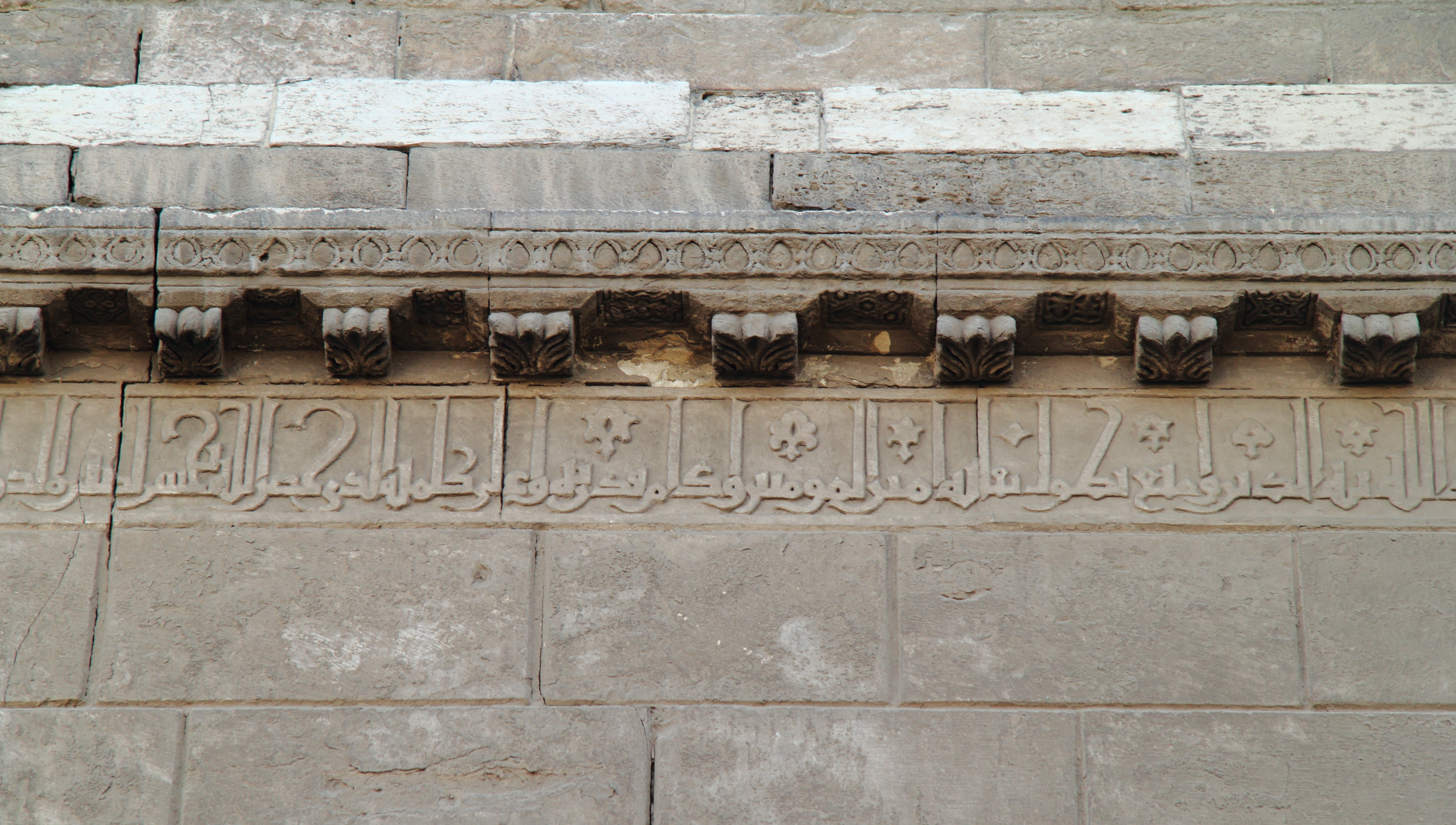
A part of the long inscription praising Badr al-Jamali

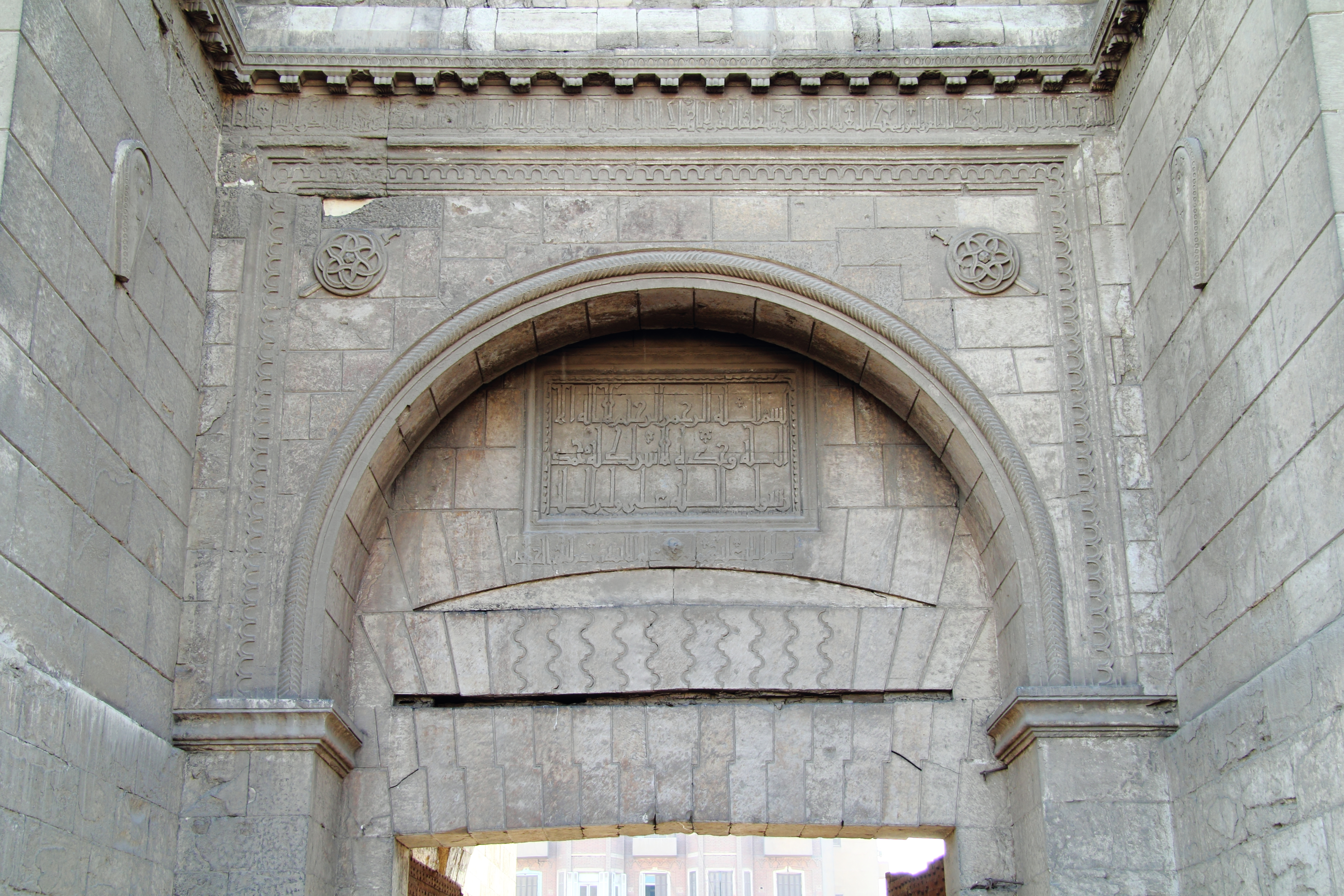
Details of the outer (northern) façade of the gate

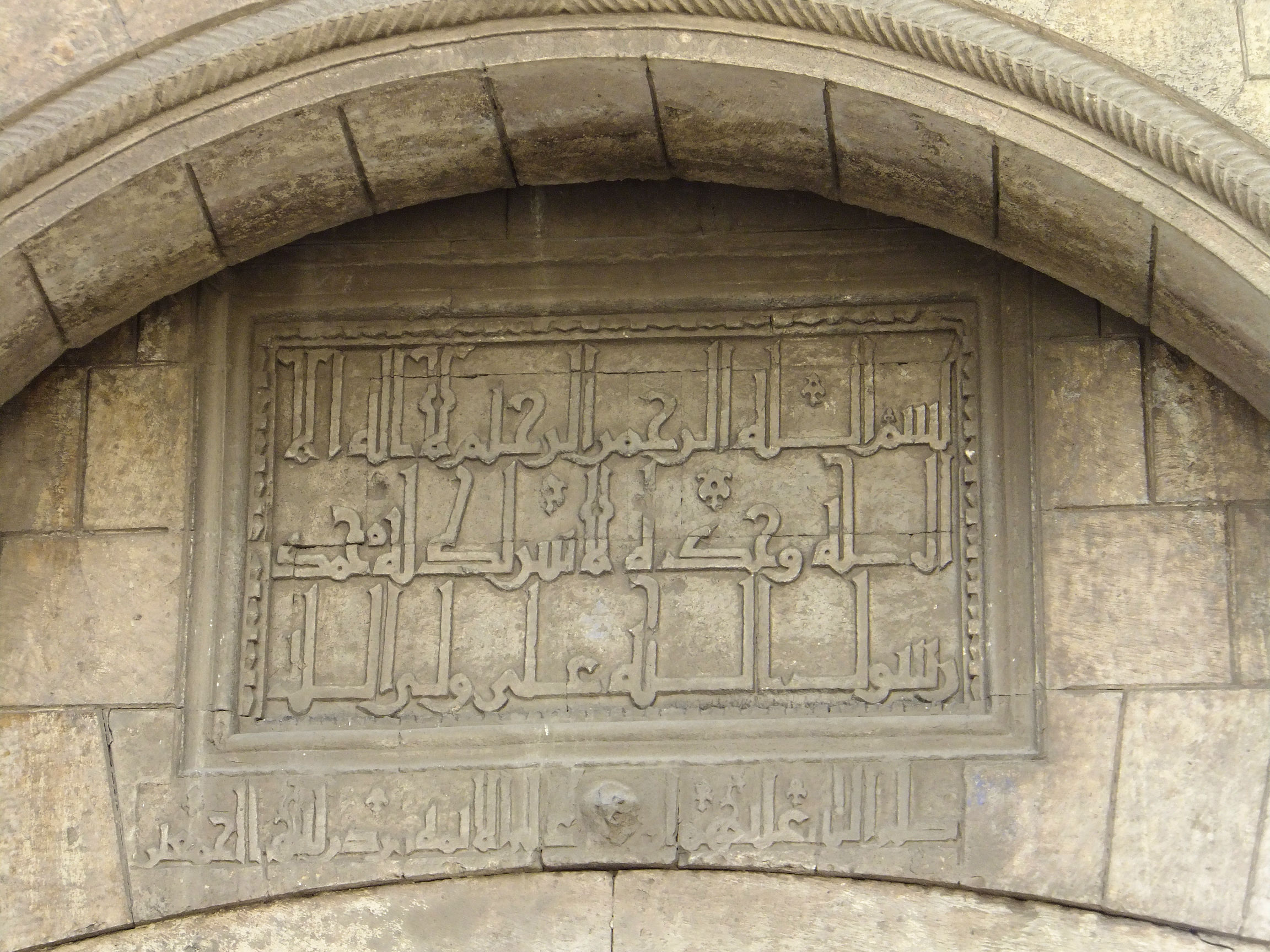
Inscription panel containing the Shahada

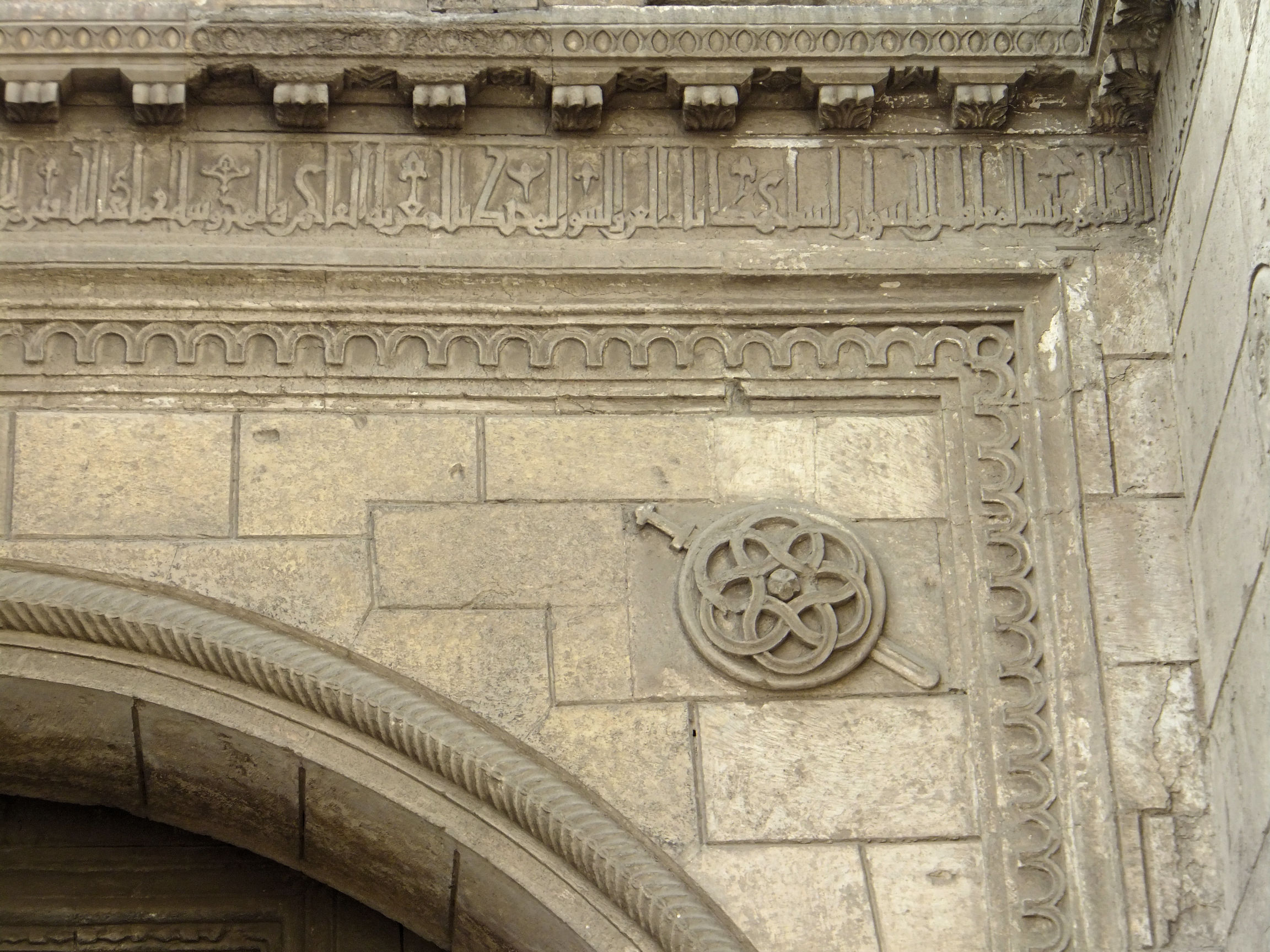
Decorative shield and sword motif in the spandrel of the arch, with inscription above

== See also ==
- Bab al-Futuh
- Bab Zuweila
- Gates of Cairo
- Jafar us Sadiq Bibliography
- List of Historic Monuments in Cairo
