= Abdullah Quraishi Al-Azhari =

Indian scholar (1935–2015)

Maulana Alhaj Abdullah Quraishi Al-Azhari
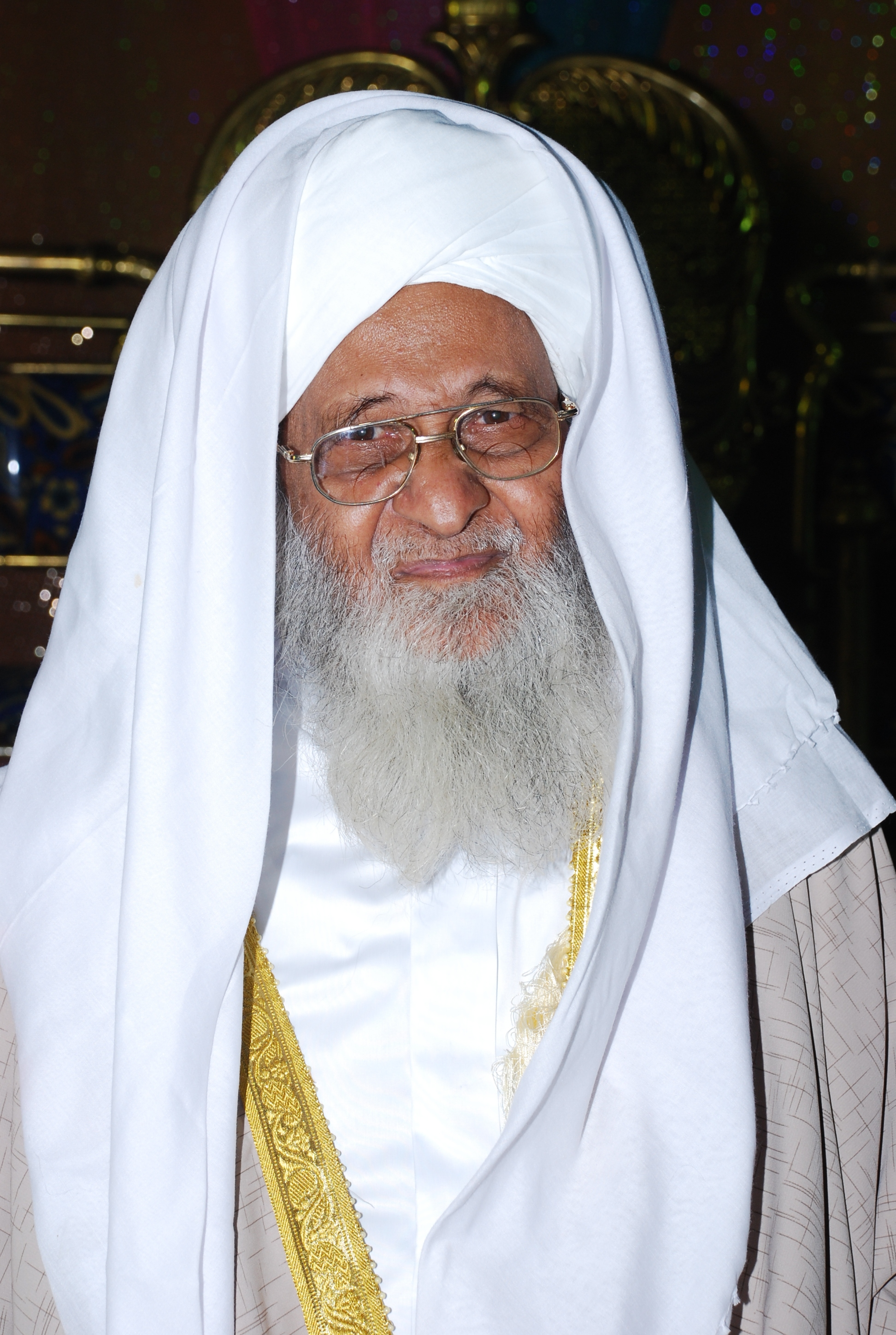
- Born: 19 September 1935; Dundigal, Ranga Reddy District, Telangana, India
- Died: 8 December 2015 (aged 80)
- Occupations: Imam and Khateeb of Mecca Masjid Hyderabad

Philosophical work
- Main interests: Hadith, Tafsir, Adab, Qirat, Khateeb and Islamic Philosophy
- Website: qirath.com

Maulana Abdullah Quraishi Al-Azhari (19 September 1935 – 8 December 2015 Hyderabad) was an Islamic scholar from Hyderabad, India. He served as the khateeb and imam of the Mecca Masjid in Hyderabad and the vice chancellor of Jamia Nizamia University.

== Early life and education ==
Quraishi was born to Abdur Raheem, in Dundigal, Andhra Pradesh, also an imam of the Mecca Masjid, on September 19, 1935.

He went to Hyderabad from Dundigal and started his studies as a student in Hifz and Qirath of Quran in Mecca Masjid. Then he studied Metric from Aligarh Muslim University and Graduated from Osmania University. Then he completed Fazil in Jamia Nizamia and Academics from Nagpur University. Maulana then completed his M.Phil by research on Dawatul Islamia Al Ma'aasirah Fil Hind. The Government of India then decided to send him to Al-Azhar University in Egypt in 1964 where he completed 'Shahadatul Aliya' and 'Shahadatut Taqassus'. He stayed in Egypt for 8 years and also learned Qirath from Sheikh Ibrahim Awad in Egypt and recited the Qur'an at many places on several occasions there.

== Return from Egypt ==
Quraishi returned to Hyderabad from Egypt in 1973 after completing his studies. After coming back, the 8th Nizam, Nawab Mir Barkath Ali Khan Mukarram Jah opened a school for teaching Qur'an with Tajweed called Idaarah Mukarram Jah Dar-ut-Tajweed Wal Qir'ath, which was located in Purani Haweli. He is an Arabic Scholar and has also taught adab since 1978 and was Sheikh-Ul-Adab in Jamia Nizamia. He also served as the Vice Chancellor of Jamia Nizamia.

== Qur'an Recitation ==
Maulana has mastered Qir'ath from Qari Abdur Raheem, Qari Abdul Bari and Qari Kaleemullah Hussaini. He also learnt Qir'ath from Sheikh Ibrahim Awad in Egypt. Maulana has a unique way of reciting Qir'ath in which all the Tunes which are called 'Lehja' in Arabic, can be completed in 5–7 minutes. He has won several awards all over the world for his Recitation. There are many competitions that are being held globally, and his disciples also go to these competitions to represent him and also to win them. His sessions on Qir'ath are conducted every day after Fajr and has been continuing since more than 30 years. The name of the Qirath school is Idaarah Mukarram Jah Dar-ut-Tajweed Wal Qir'ath,, which was opened by the 8th Nizam of Hyderabad, after he was inspired by Maulana's Qirath. Below are the places where he has taught the Qir'ath.

- 1974–1977 – Purani Haveli
- 1977–2007 – Chowmahalla Palace, Khiwath
- 2007–2009 – Mecca Masjid
- 2009–Till Death – Khaja Ka Chillah, Moghulpura, Hyderabad

In 1974, Minister of Petroleum of Saudi Arabia, Mr. Zaki Yamani came to Purani Haweli and was very inspired by his Qir'ath. Since then, Maulana has judged many Qir'ath competitions all over India, including Malaysia in 1974 and the Middle East.

== Sufism ==
Maulana was a Sufi and became a disciple of Shah Ismail Hussaini Qadri Multani and obtained Baiyyath and Khilafath from Syed Moizuddin Qadri Multani in 1950. He obtained 'Silsilah Chishtiya' from Syed Shah Noorullah Hussaini Ifteqari. Presently, Maulana has around 70–80 disciples with the Multani Silsilah and frequently attend the sessions on Tasawwuf conducted at his residence.

== Islamic career ==
- 1974 – 2015 – Teaching Qir'aath for 37 years
- 1978 – 2015 – Vice Chancellor of Jamia Nizamia and Teaching Adab
- 1979–1981 – Recited Taraweeh in Chicago, United States continuously for two years
- 1982–1993 – Principal of Lateefia College for 11 years
- 1987–2015 – Khateeb and Imam of Mecca Masjid since 24 years

== 50 Years of Service to Islam ==
Makkah Masjid decorated on the ceremony of Maulana's 50 Years of Service to Islam

On the occasion of 50 years of Islamic service, there was a huge ceremony conducted in Mecca Masjid on 15 May 2012, in honor of Maulana Abdullah Quraishi Sahab. His service includes teaching of Islamic Adab, Literature, Hadees, Qirath, Tasawwuf and he was also Imam and Khateeb of Mecca Masjid where thousands of Muslims have prayed behind him. He has also been reciting Taraweeh in the Month of Ramadan and has always been reciting the Qutbah on the occasion of Eid in the ‘EidGah’ and Milad-Un-Nabi in the Mecca Masjid for four decades.

For these services, he was awarded for 50 Years of Service which was attended by thousands of people in Makkah Masjid in Hyderabad. There were many dignitaries along with the President and all lecturers of Jamia Nizamia. Many dignitaries from AIMIM including Asaduddin Owaisi were also present at this ceremony.

== Death and burial ==
Funeral prayers in Makkah Masjid

Procession going from Charminar

Maulana's Janaazah (Body) being taken by the Funeral Procession.

Abdullah Quraishi had a mild cardiac attack in 2008, when he was delivering Taraweeh prayers in Masjid Mir Wazeer Ali in Hyderabad. After that, he was taken to Care hospital and since then, he had trouble in walking due to weakness. He also had a hernia surgery in April 2014 and since then he was having more trouble in walking. Even then he used to deliver all his lectures in Jamia Nizamia and also used to teach Qirat in the morning. Abdullah Quraishi was also suffering from Respiratory problems since 2013 and had trouble breathing in his last days. He was taken to hospital multiple times and died on 8 December 2015.

Abdullah Quraishi's funeral was conducted on 9 December 2015, the very next day after his demise. It was delayed, as number of people including his Son-In-Law, Abdur Razzaq Mohiuddin had come from different parts of the world to attend it. Funeral prayer was conducted after 'Dhuhr' prayers in Makkah Masjid at around 1:30 PM. An estimated number of 2 Lakh people attended his Prayer and this was the highest turnout of people in Hyderabad for a funeral. The funeral procession started from Makkah Masjid through Charminar, Laad Bazar, Masjid Chowk, Hussaini Alam, Shibli Gunj and was rested for a few minutes in Jamia Nizamia in front of the shrine of Maulana Anwarullah Farooqi. After that, it was taken through Fateh Darwaza and finally to the shrine of Abdullah Shah, at Misriganj.

His death was condoled by Chief Minister of Telangana K Chandrashekar Rao, Deputy Chief Minister M Mohammed Mahmood Ali, ministers Nayani Narasimha Reddy and K. T. Rama Rao, Leader of Opposition in Council Mohammed Ali Shabbir and Rajya Sabha member V Hanumantha Rao.

== See also ==
- Jamia Nizamia
- Mecca Masjid
- Imam
