= Yasmina Azhari =

Syrian businesswoman

- Education: French literature
- Board member of: Board of Directors of the Latakia Chamber of Commerce
- Father: Riad Azhari
- Honours: Honorary Consul of the Netherlands at Latakia & Tartous and Order of Orange-Nassau

Yasmina Azhari is a Syrian businesswoman. She is the founder of Mira Trading, and co-founder of Dubai-based Al Yam International.

== Early life ==
Azhari was born in Latakia. Her father was Riad Azhari, who held the position of the Honorary Consul of the Netherlands at Latakia & Tartous in the 1970s. Her mother was a Serbian native. She studied French literature.

== Career ==
Azhari started her career in her family business in maritime transport. In 1999, she became a partner and general manager at the Trade Coordination Office (TCO), a shipping agency that represented Maersk Shipping in Syria from 1978 to 2017. She was also appointed the Honorary Consul of the Netherlands at Latakia & Tartous, and held the position for ten years. Azhari joined the Board of Directors of the Latakia Chamber of Commerce, and elected three times as the head of Latakia Business Women's Committee.

She was the president of the Arab Business Women Council, member of the advisory board of Bank Audi Syria, and member of the United Nation Advisory Council of the Global Charter on Syria.

Azhari is engaged in civil activities in Syria and the UAE. She was the co-founder and president of Modernizing and Activating Women's Role in Economic Development (MAWRED), a society dedicated to empower Syrian women through creating jobs. She also founded a community to protect the Slunfeh and Kassab forests in Latakia. Azhari is co-founder and head of Bashaer Al Nour, an NGO to provide help for children with autism and Down syndrome.

In February 2018 she was appointed the Chairwoman of Syria Saudi Company for Touristic Investments, the owner of Four Seasons Hotel in Syria.

== Recognition ==
Yasmina Azhari is the first Syrian woman to hold the position of Honorary Consul, and the first woman to join the Board of Directors of the Chamber of Commerce and Industry in Latakia.

Azhari received the Order of Orange-Nassau of the Netherlands (Knight), making her the first Syrian woman to hold a knighthood from a foreign country.

She was listed three times in Forbes’ 50 Most Powerful Arab Businesswomen, as well as being listed three times in Arabian Business’ 100 Most Powerful Women in the Arab World.

She was chosen the best entrepreneur in Syria by Ernst & Young in 2011.

== Personal life ==
Azhari is married and has a son and a daughter, Mohammed and Rania. After the Syrian conflict in 2012, she moved with her family to the UAE.
