= Al-Azhar Park =

Public park in Cairo, Egypt

- Interactive map of Al-Azhar Park
- Motto: Paradise within the heart of Medieval Cairo
- Location: Medieval Cairo, Egypt
- Coordinates: 30.040523°N 31.264631°E
- Area: 30 hectares (74 acres)
- Created: May 2005

Al-Azhar Park (Arabic: حديقة الأزهر, romanized: Ḥadīqat al-Azhar) is a public park located in qism al-Darb al-Ahmar, in Historic Cairo, Egypt.

Among several honors, this park is listed as one of the world's sixty great public spaces by the Project for Public Spaces. The park was created by the Historic Cities Support Programme of the Aga Khan Trust for Culture (AKTC), an entity of the Aga Khan Development Network. The park was developed at a cost in excess of US$30 million, its funding a grant to Cairo from Aga Khan IV, a direct descendant of Prophet Muhammad through his daughter, Fatima, and cousin/son-in-law, Ali. He is therefore a descendant of the early Fatimid Caliphs of Cairo.

The park project, an urbanism initiative, included:

- the development of the park
- archeology involving a 12th-century Ayyubid wall
- historic building rehabilitation (the 14th Century Umm Sultan Shaban Mosque, the 13th century Khayrbek complex, and the Darb Shoughlan School)
- several quality of life improvement initiatives requiring skills training, area rehabilitation, microfinance, and support in the areas of health and education, among others.

== Location ==
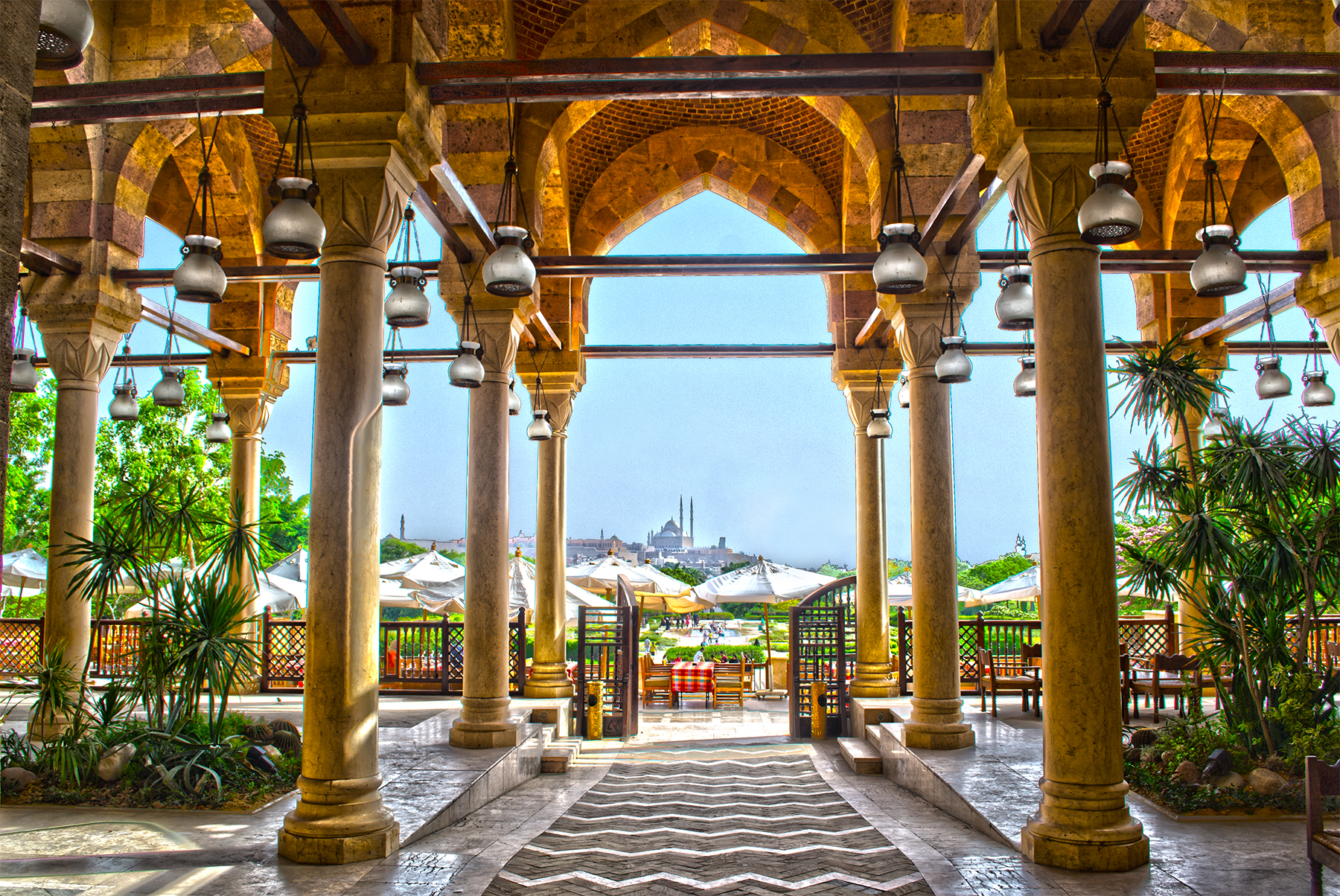
View of Mosque of Muhammad Ali from Studio Masr Restaurant

The park site is the Darassa Hills, a 31 hectares (77 acres) area less than 4 kilometres (2.5 mi) from the Nile with a north-south stretch of hills. The site is bounded to the west by the Ayyubid wall and to the east by cemeteries. The Cairo Citadel is to the south.

The site was historically used as a landfill, particularly for debris from redevelopment. The practice intensified in the 16th century during the Mamluk Sultanate. By the late-20th century, the fill was 40 metres (130 ft) deep in some parts. No development occurred as the fill was unsuitable as building foundations and the cost of fill removal was prohibitive.

== Site rehabilitation ==
In 1984, Aga Khan IV decided to donate a park to Cairo following a conference organized by the Aga Khan Award for Architecture called "The Expanding Metropolis: Coping with the Urban Growth of Cairo". The Darassa Hills were selected for their proximity to the historic districts of Islamic Cairo. Existing occupants on the site were relocated in the late-1980s, including a police horse compound. Afterwards, the General Organization for Greater Cairo Water Supply took over the site to build water tanks funded by the United States Agency for International Development; the tanks were to be completed in 1995. In 1990, AKTC and the Cairo Governorate concluded a new agreement which incorporated the water tanks into the park design. The master plan was developed with the help of Sasaki. The site was taken over by AKTC in 1996. By this time, the park was part of a larger Aga Khan Historic Cities Programme plan to rehabilitate Al-Darb al-Ahmar.

Earthworks and grading began in 1997 as detailed design continued. The existing soil and fill were subject to settlement under load or destabilization through water absorption. Soil replacement and insertion of water-impervious clayey soil was done by partially excavating areas where fill was sufficiently compact. Older layers of fill were isolated from future irrigated and planted areas were isolated by similar soil barriers. Over one million cubic meters of fill were removed.

While the designers grappled with the technical difficulties at hand posed by the terrain and soil the government introduces an additional unexpected constraint at halfway through the process: three cisterns were to be integrated into the terrain to improve the supply of potable water to the city of Cairo. Works had to be interrupted and the design revised to integrate the new three elements. The new revised layout of the park was then carefully designed according to the landscape of the hill and the new 3 water tanks. It is mainly divided in five sections according to slope inclination, leaving us with: 2 hills (southern and northern), a rolling topography hill to the east, a flat area north and a western steep slope.

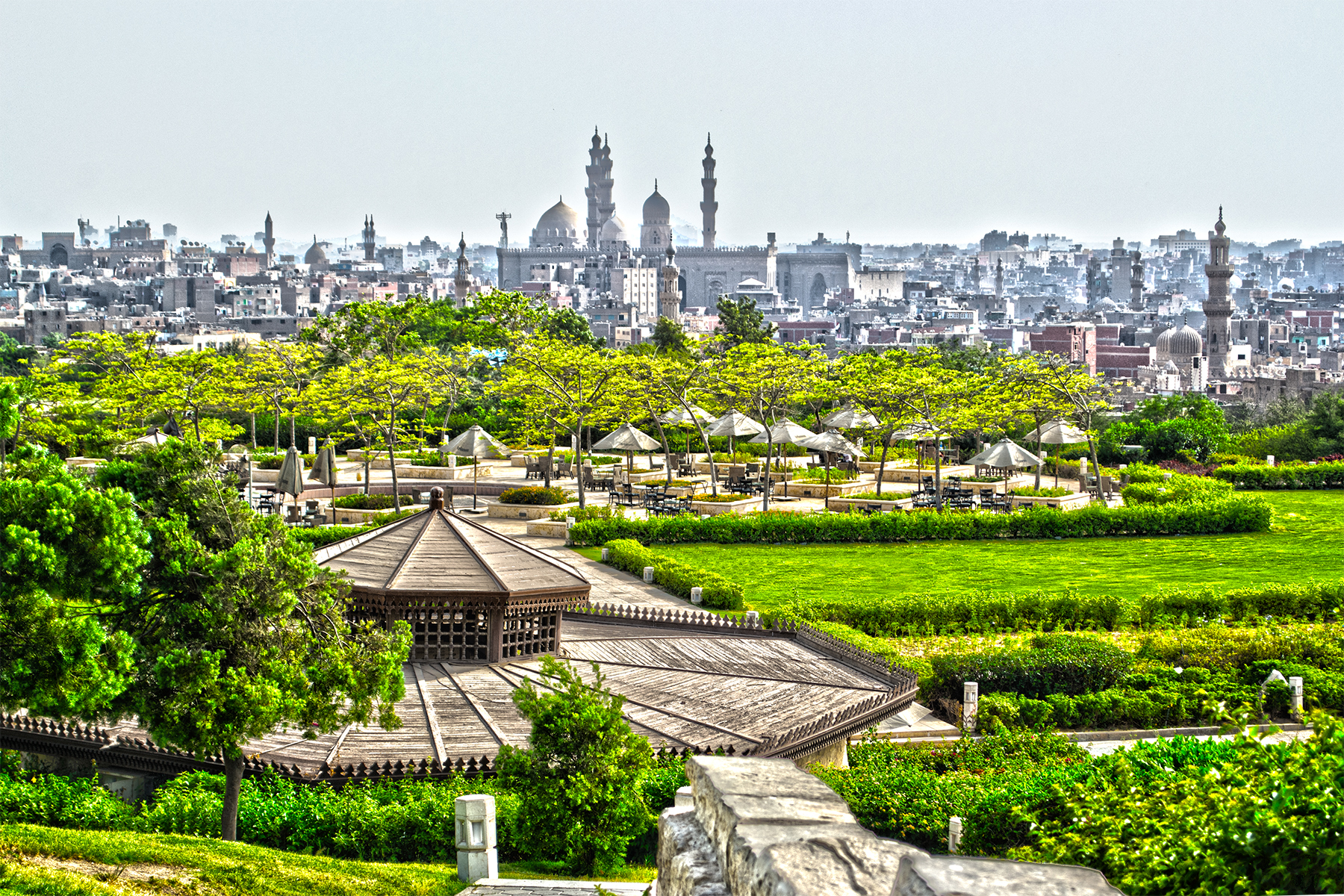
The garden.

The designers insisted on integrating traditional Islamic landscape traditions in both their design and choice of greenery, thus allowing the past flow of the city to come back to life. Tradition and historical legacy were preserved: This legacy can be seen in a variety of styles from different periods and different regions. It is reflected in the bustan-like orchard spaces, the shaded sitting areas (takhtaboush) and the Fatimid archways used in the construction of Park buildings, among other elements. Persian and Timurid elements are also reflected in the water channels and fountains. The Nile, symbol of Egypt and Cairo, also finds a place in the new project as the river is designed to feed the water ponds in the park. The choice of plantation was also carefully made, according to landscape and quality of soil. Several tests were done at the American University in Cairo that offered its nursery for propagating the flora of the park to make sure that the adequate choices for the climate were being made. Opened to the public in 2005, the gardens of al-Azhar are reminiscent of historical Islamic gardens, with a blend of modern and traditional elements. The central terraced formal gardens, emphatic use of fountains, Mamluk multicolored stonework, sunken gardens, intersecting waterways and bold Islamic geometry are all integrated into a contemporary site design; cafes are situated at the entrance, playgrounds and scenic overlooks are arranged along curving paths. The site is supported by a reservoir constructed for the project.

=== Restoration of Ayyubid wall ===
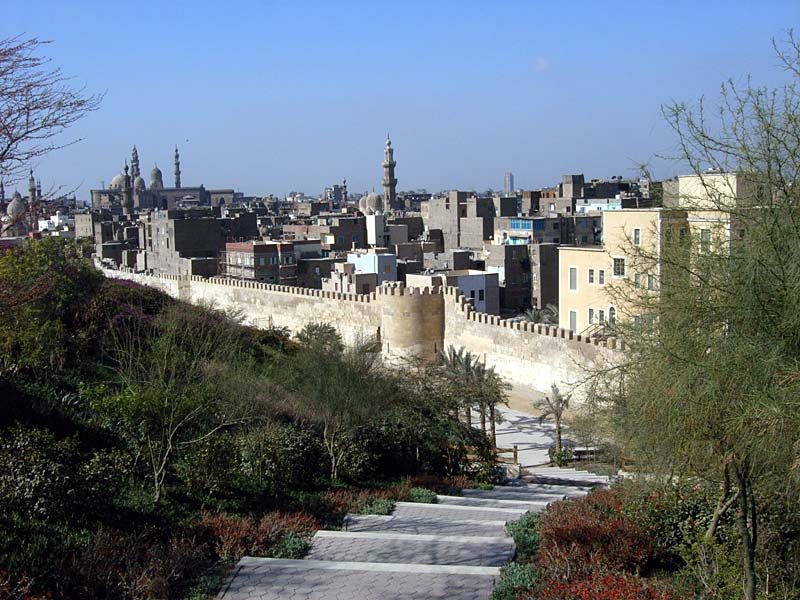
The eastern face of the Ayyubid Wall.

While the excavation was still ongoing, under the mounts of garbage a treasure was uncovered: a wall to a depth of 15 meters and a 1.5 kilometers section. The forgotten historic Ayyubid wall and towers were revealed in their entire splendor. It quickly became evident that the new uncovered gem was inseparable from the park project. Buried during centuries, the stone wall presented different forms of deterioration such as flaking and disaggregation. "[The] segment of wall constitutes a uniform piece of construction. It comprises a few repeating elements, such as round-fronted towers and curtain walls, and is consistent in its use of materials. […] The walls are adorned and punctuated by crenellations, arrow slits, stairwells and chambers." Among the structures uncovered and restored were two former eastern city gates: Bab al-Barqiyya and Bab al-Mahruq.

== Urban Plaza and Museum of Historic Cairo ==
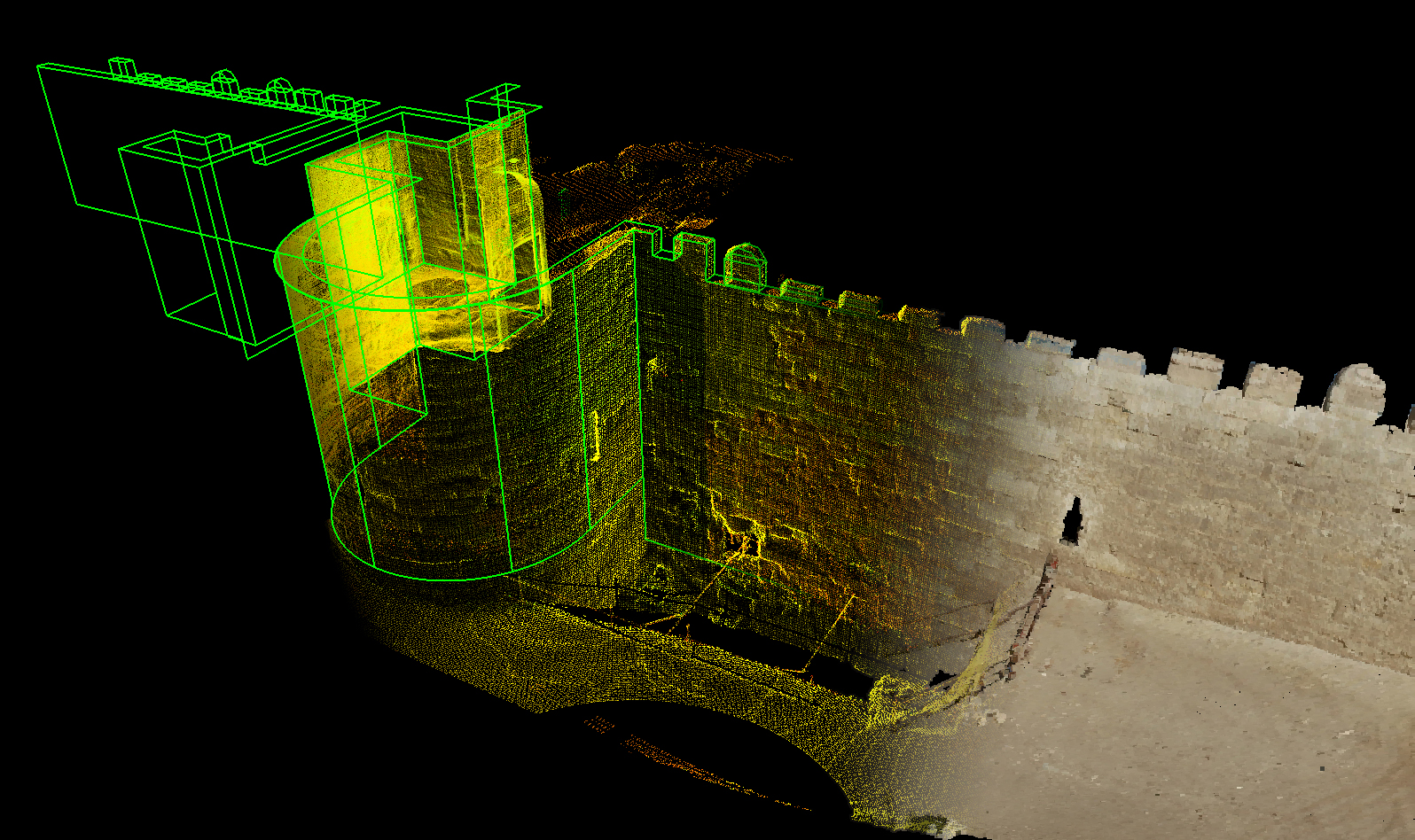
Isometric laser scan data image of a portion of the 12th century Ayyubid Wall that borders Al-Azhar Park, including Bab al-Barqiyya gate

At the Northern end of the park, an "Urban Plaza" project is under development which will house the Museum of Historic Cairo. The Urban Plaza will be a mixed-use centre with underground car parking, shops and cultural facilities. It is being built by the Aga Khan Trust for Culture in cooperation with the Supreme Council of Antiquities of Egypt.

The Museum will describe the evolution of Egypt's capital city Cairo, and house some of the great wealth of art and artifacts of the city's Islamic heritage that are not currently on display. With 4,000 square metres of exhibition space spread over two floors, the museum is expected to have 1,000 pieces on display from different historical periods. It will provide visitors insight into the urban, cultural and architectural history of the heart of Cairo.

To conserve and restore all the artefacts and artworks which will be shown in the museum, the Trust has set up a major conservation laboratory, which is training young technicians in this field. It is also being used to restore important art and architectural elements for the Cairo Museum of Islamic Art.

== Awards and recognition ==
- Al-Azhar Park is listed among the 60 of the World's Great Places by Project for Public Spaces
- 2005 Travel +Leisure magazine Global Vision Innovation Award

== Photos ==
Al-Azhar Park

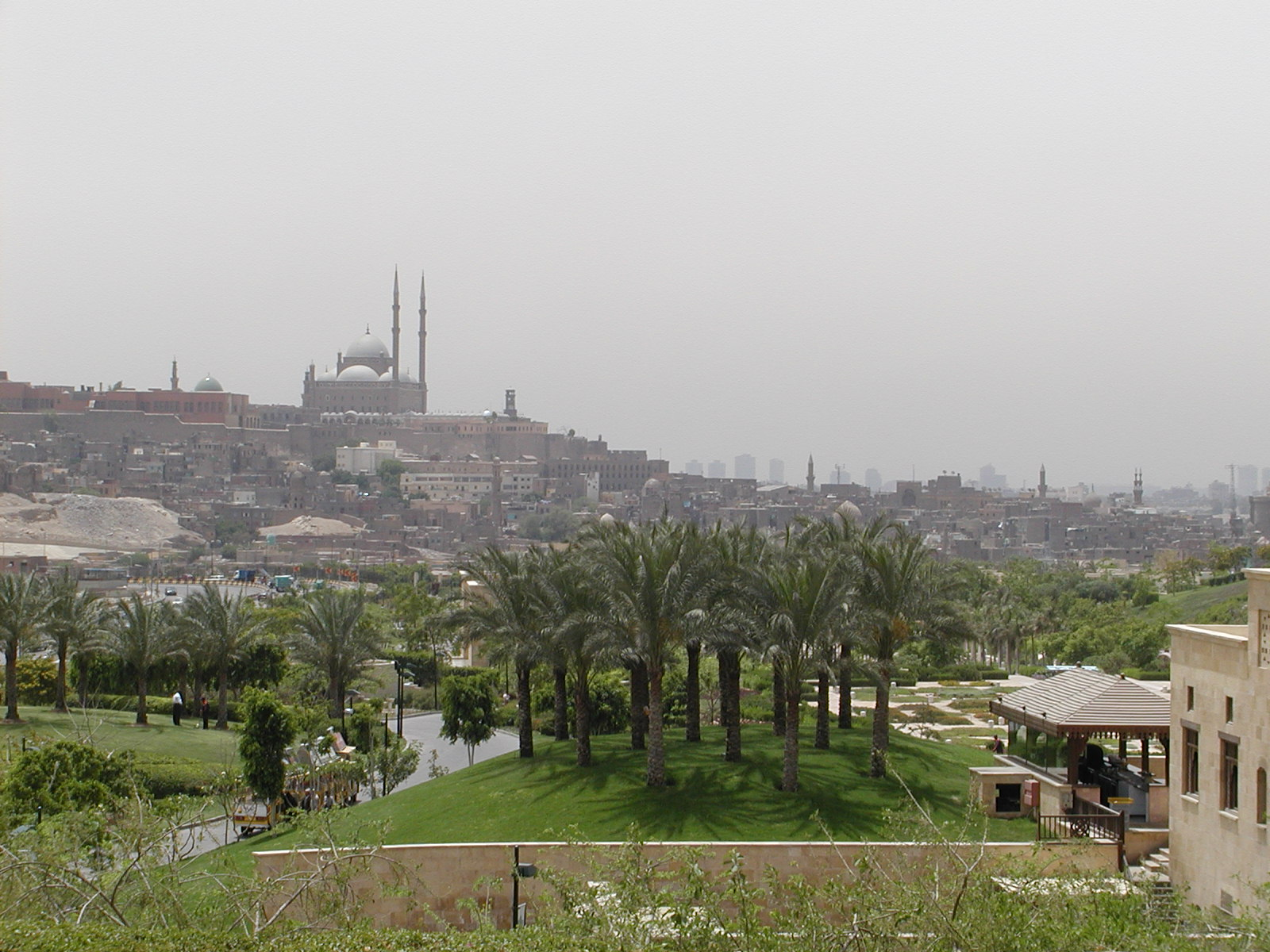
City view from an overlook in the park

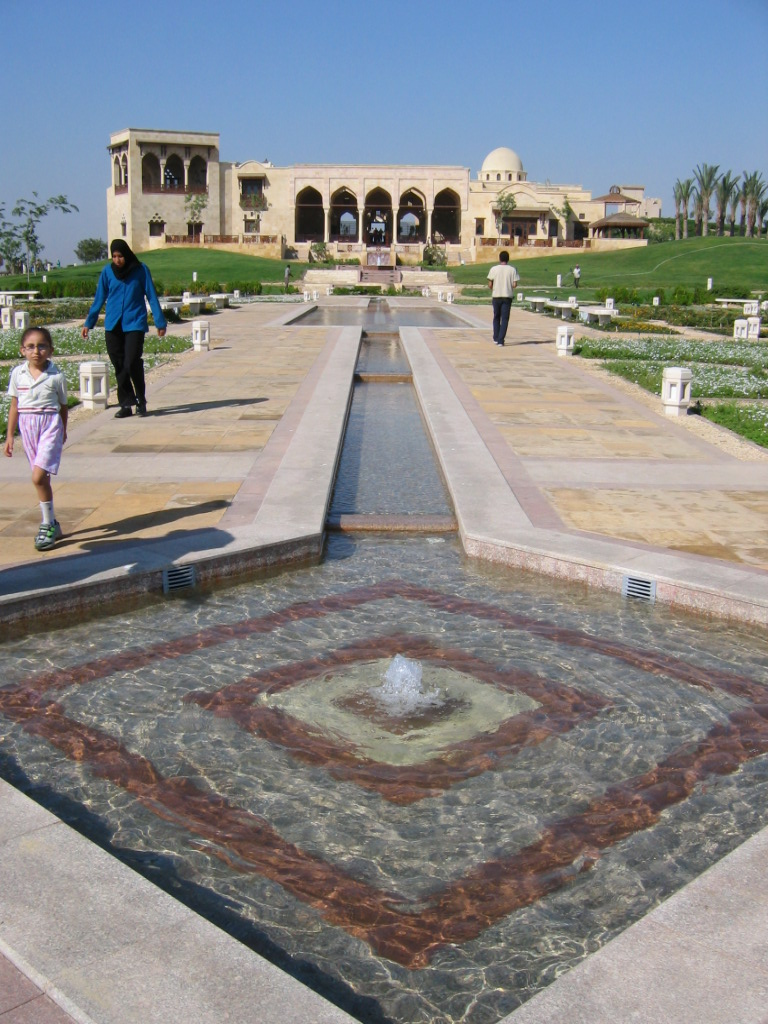
Waterways and walkways

== Sources ==
- Aga Khan Trust for Culture (2001), The Azhar Park Project in Cairo and the Conservation and Revitalisation Of Darb Al-Ahmar (PDF), Lausanne, Switzerland: Imprimeries Réunies Lausanne
- Rashti, Cameron (2004). "The Development of Azhar Park" (pdf). In Bianca, Stefano; Jadidio; Philip (eds.). Cairo: Revitalising a Historic Metropolis. Turin: Umberto Allemandi & Co. for the Aga Khan Trust for Culture. ISBN 978-8842212355.
- "Aga Khan and Madame Mubarak Inaugurate Cairo's Al-Azhar Park - AKDN, March 25, 2005". Archived from the original on 2006-12-06.
- "Article: Rescuing Cairo's Lost Heritage - Islamica Magazine, Issue 15, 2006". Archived from the original on 2006-10-26.
