= Azhar (name) =

- Gender: Male

Origin
- Origin: Arabic
- Meaning: Shining, Luminous, Brilliant
- Region of origin: Arabia

Azhar (Arabic: أَزْهَر aẓhar) is an Arabic male name common among South Asians, that means Radiant, Shining, Luminous, Brilliant or Clear. Notable people with the name include:

== Surname ==
- Antasari Azhar (1953–2025), Pakistani chairman of the Corruption Eradication Commission of Indonesia
- Masood Azhar (born 1968), Pakistani mujaheddin
- Mohammad Azharuddin (born 1963), Indian cricketer

== See also ==
- Azhari (name)
