= Sultan al-Ghuri Complex =

Mosque, Madrassa, Tomb and Sabil in Cairo, Egypt

Sultan Qansuh al-Ghuri Complex
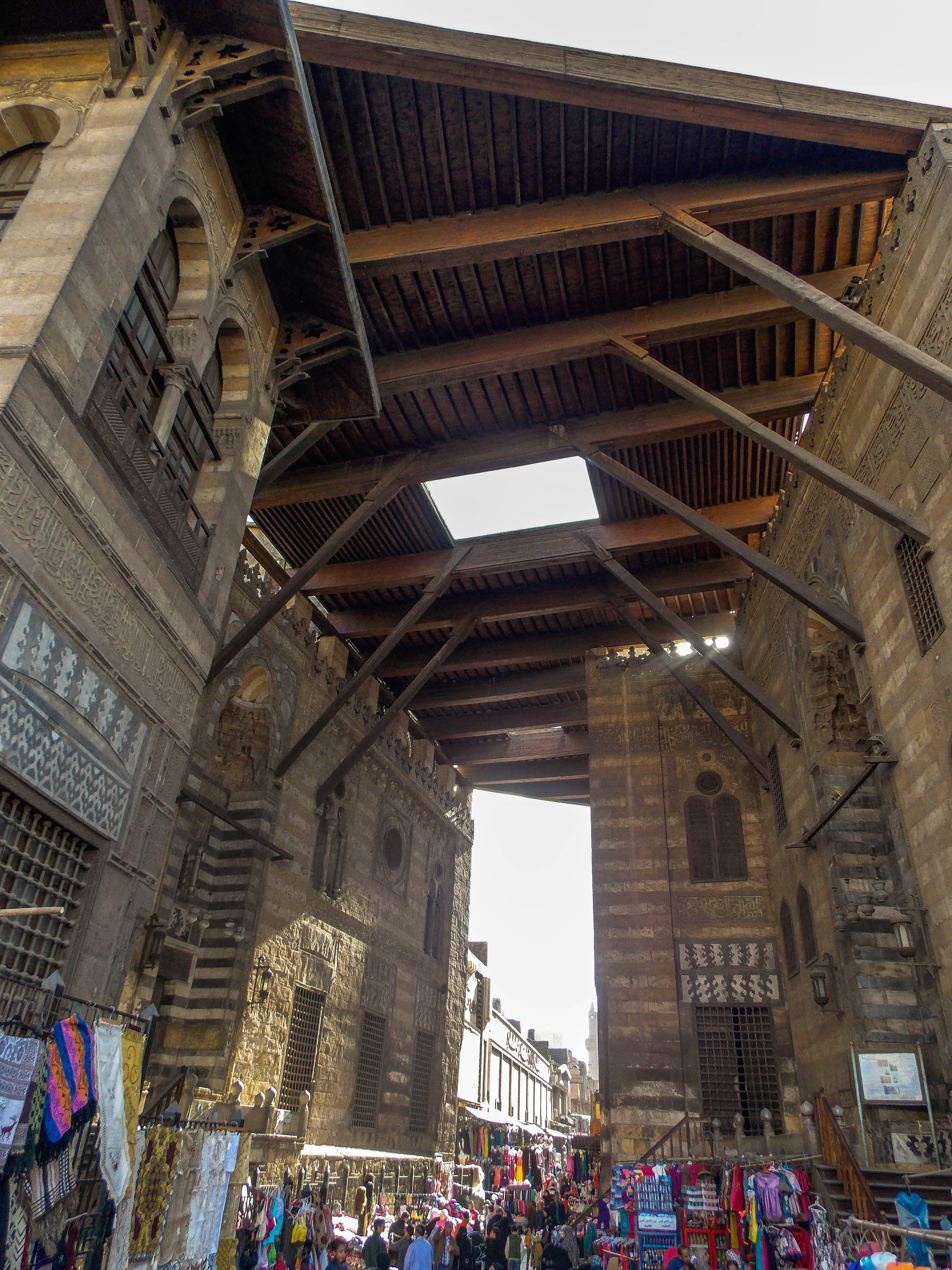
- The khanqah-mausoleum (left) and the mosque (right)

Religion
- Affiliation: Sunni Islam
- Ecclesiastical or organisational status: Mosque; Mausoleum; Khanqah; Sabil-kuttab; Madrasa
- Status: Active mosque (western); Tourist site (eastern)

Location
- Location: Islamic Cairo
- Country: Egypt
- Interactive map of Sultan Qansuh al-Ghuri Complex
- Coordinates: 30°2′45.78″N 31°15′35.57″E

Architecture
- Type: Islamic religious funerary complex
- Style: Mamluk; Islamic
- Founder: Qansuh al-Ghuri
- Completed: 1503 CE (original); 2000 (restored)

Specifications
- Dome: 1 (replaced in 1860 with a flat roof)
- Dome height (outer): 36 metres (118 ft)
- Dome dia. (outer): 12.5 metres (41 ft)
- Minaret: 1

UNESCO World Heritage Site
- Criteria: Cultural: (i)(v)(vi)
- Designated: 1979 (3rd session)
- Part of: Historic Cairo
- Reference no.: 89-002

The Sultan al-Ghuri Complex, also known as the Funerary complex of Sultan al-Ghuri, and as the al-Ghuriya, is a monumental Islamic religious and funerary complex built by the Mamluk sultan Qansuh al-Ghuri between 1503 and 1505 CE. The complex consists of two major buildings facing each other on al-Mu'izz li-Din Allah Street, in the Fahhamin Quarter, in the middle of the historic part of Cairo, Egypt. The eastern side of the complex includes the Sultan's mausoleum, a khanqah, a sabil (water distribution kiosk), and a kuttab (Islamic primary school), while the western side of the complex is a mosque and madrasa. Today the mosque-madrasa is open as a mosque while the former khanqah-mausoleum is open to visitors as a historic site.

== History ==
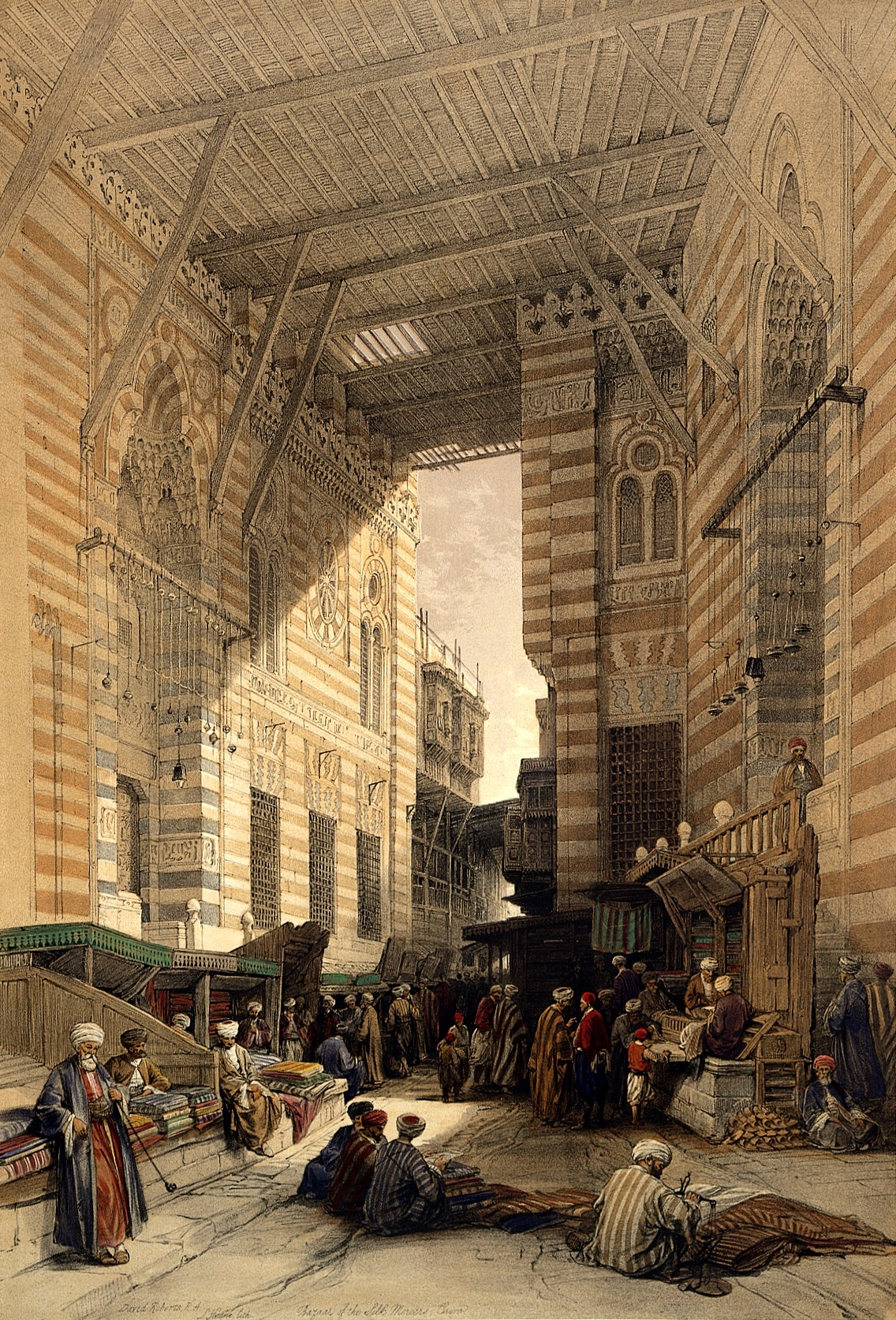
A well-known drawing of the Ghuriya buildings and the market street in between them, made by David Roberts in 1839.

=== The reign of al-Ghuri ===
The second last of the Mamluk sultans, Sultan Qansuh al-Ghuri was the last Mamluk sultan to enjoy a reign of any duration (1501–16). He was called 'al-Ghuri' after the al-Ghuri barracks, where he was garrisoned. He was the governor of Tarsus, then the chamberlain of Aleppo and he was involved heavily in the military campaign against the Ottomans in 1484. Al-Ghuri died of a heart attack while fighting the Ottoman Turks outside Aleppo, following the defection of Amir Khayrbak in the midst of the battle. His body was never found, and was not buried in his mausoleum on which he had spent a fortune.

Like other Sultans of his time, al-Ghuri is portrayed as an energetic, cruel, superstitious and despotic leader. Harsh punishments were imposed on people during his reign for crimes committed or during money collection. Despite cruelty, al-Ghuri was fond of music, poetry and flowers and was attracted to Sufis and other pious men. He was a great patron of architecture, and a man of refined cultural tastes. Although the economic conditions were somewhat miserable, the sultan pursued to the very end of his reign a passion for regal pomp, spending considerable funds and confiscating properties to build representative buildings.

=== Construction of the complex ===
In order to build his own funerary complex in the heart of Cairo's market zone along al-Muizz Street, al-Ghuri confiscated and demolished a number of properties including shops, residences, and an older madrasa founded by a eunuch named Mukhtass, which provoked strong criticism. Construction began in 1502 and finished in 1504 or 1505.

The royal mausoleum was intended to not only house the sultan's tomb but also a number of relics related to Muhammad and a Qur'an volume alleged to have belonged to Caliph Uthman. The relics were previously housed in a structure known as the Ribat al-Athar, south of Fustat, founded by the vizier Taj al-Din ibn Hanna (d. 1303) who had purchased the relics from a family in the Hijaz. The tile decoration for the exterior of the dome required the establishment of a ceramics workshop, as Cairene craftsmen did not use much ceramic decoration until this point. The mausoleum of Azrumuk in the Northern Cemetery, built in 1503-04 around the same time, is also decorated with blue tiles which must have come from the same workshop. The workshop continued to operate after the Ottoman conquest of 1517.

The mosque was inaugurated with a great banquet in May 1503 on the eve of Eid al-Adha, with major officials and the symbolic Abbasid caliph al-Mustamsik in attendance. An inscription inside dates its completion to slightly later, in August–September 1503. The sabil-kuttab was completed in May–June 1504. The relics of Muhammad were moved to the mausoleum in October–November 1504. Although the current wooden roof over the street is a modern replacement, a similar roof historically existed here, as attested by an 1846 painting by David Roberts. The open space between the two buildings was rented to people to create market stalls.

=== Later history ===
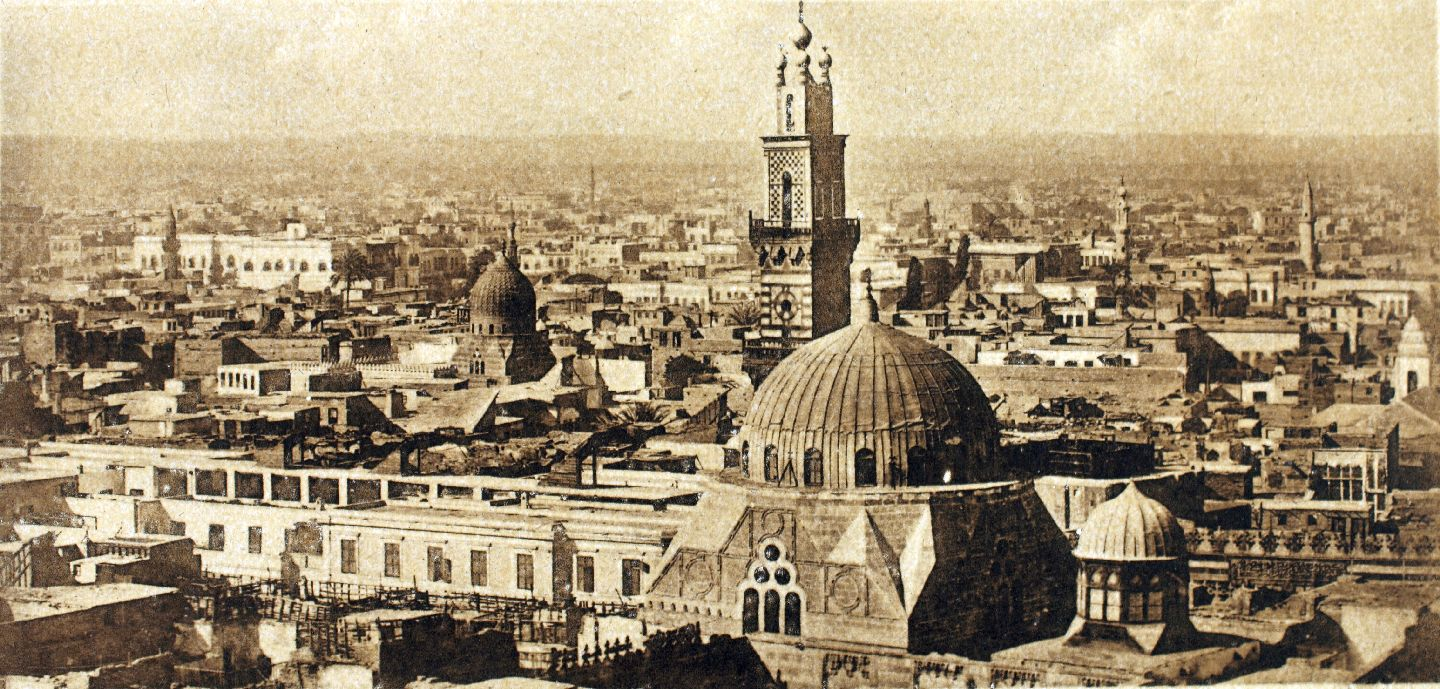
Historical image of the complex, prior to the dismantling of the mausoleum dome (foreground, center right)

The large dome of the mausoleum was unstable from the beginning and was rebuilt twice soon after its initial construction, in 1512 and in 1513. Some of the marble decoration in the mosque had been taken from older monuments and placed here on al-Ghuri's orders. After his conquest of Egypt in 1517, the Ottoman sultan Selim II had this marble decoration removed in turn and taken to Istanbul. Both the mausoleum dome and the top of the minaret were replaced in the 19th century due to collapse or structural deficiencies. The dome was eventually replaced by a flat wooden roof in 1860. The complex was damaged by the 1992 earthquake and underwent restorations that were completed in 2000.

== Layout and exterior appearance ==
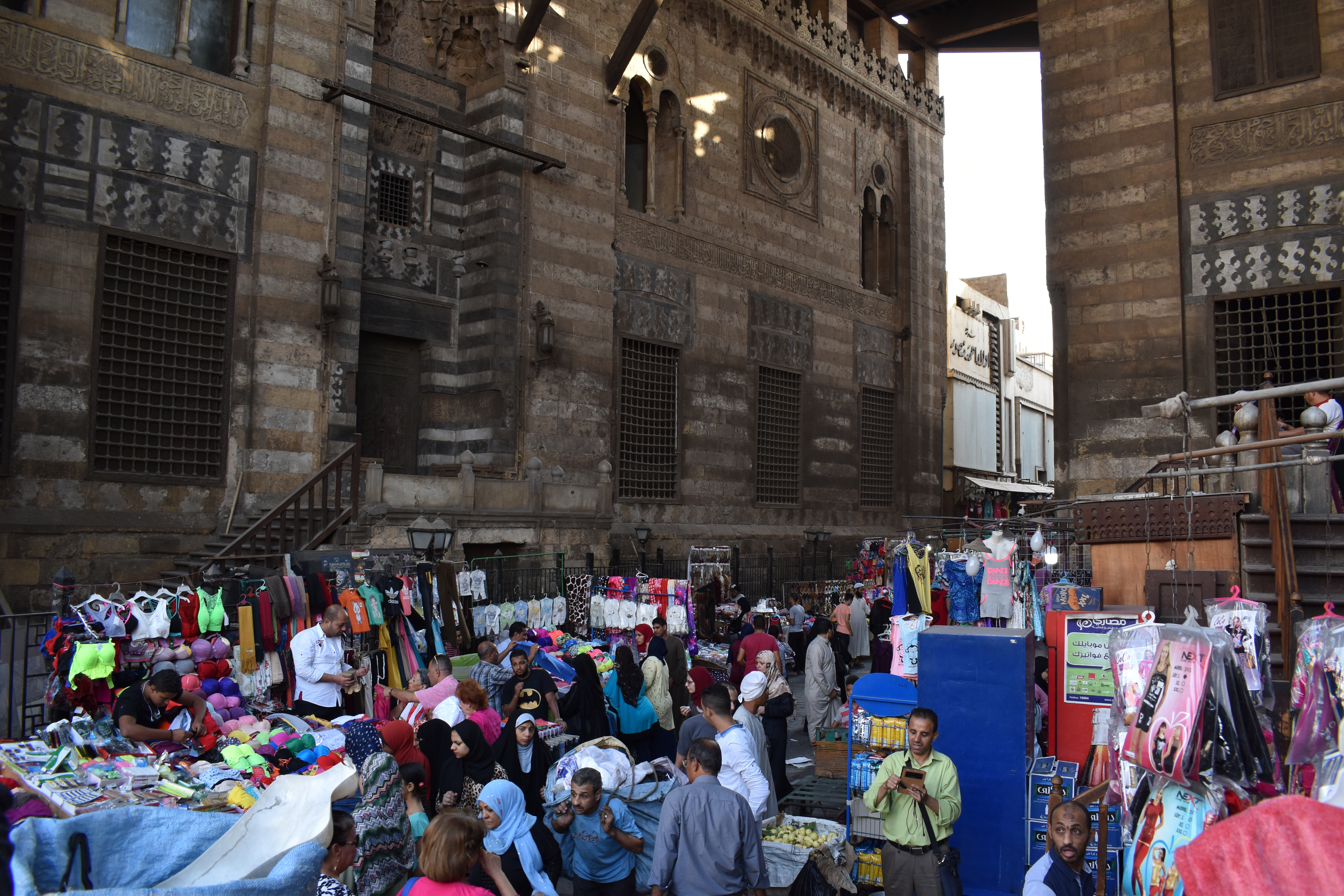
The market between the two wings of the complex today

The funerary complex has a remarkable layout as a double architectural composition, with two blocks straddling the main street in the heart of medieval Cairo. There are two blocks: the western - consisting of a mosque with its minaret; the eastern one is a funerary complex, consisting of a mausoleum, a hall called Khanqah, a maq'ad (reception hall), a graveyard and a sabil-kuttab. Both the buildings are built above shops connected to markets stretching along the side street. To provide shade for the street a wooden roof links the buildings. This area was historically part of Cairo's textile market and textiles and clothes continue to be sold here today. Al-Ghuri also had a wikala (caravanserai) built nearby, slightly to the east along Sharia al-Azhar, known as the Wikala of al-Ghuri. It provided revenues for the main complex and remains one of the best-preserved buildings of its kind today.

The complex was designed to reveal its minaret-and-dome composition to an onlooker coming from the south. Although the dome and the minaret are separated by the street, they were conceived as a single, harmonious composition and were united by blue ceramic decoration. These blue ceramics are similar to the blue ceramic decoration on the sultan's minaret at al-Azhar. Unlike other religious complexes, the facades of the complex are not adjusted to the street alignment. They rather follow the orientation of the two sides of the complex. This creates a square and is semi-enclosed at the north end by the projection of the sabil-kuttab of the mausoleum, and at the south end by the projection of the minaret of the madrasa. The market and the rents helped pay for the upkeep of al-Ghuri's complex.

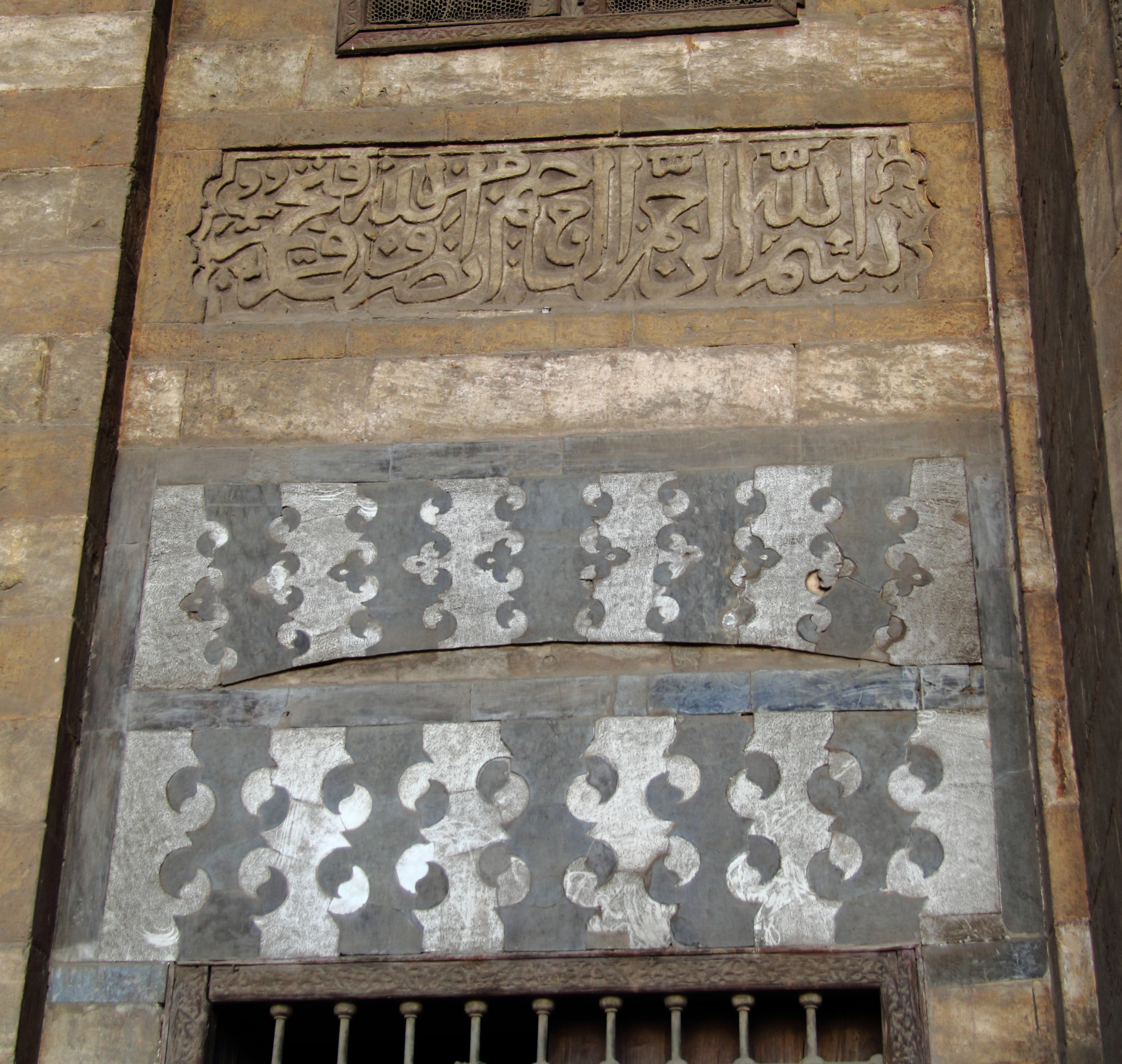
Example of marble mosaic and stone-carved epigraphic decoration on the exterior of the buildings

The facades of the two buildings are not identical, however they have similar features. The windows of the lower floor are rectangular while those above have a characteristic Mamluk triple composition with two arched windows and a round oculus above. The portals are recessed and have trilobed profiles, muqarnas carving, and marble paneling in variations of black and white. The columns at the corner of the mosque and the mausoleum have capitals of Coptic and Byzantine styles, indicating that the Mamluk craftsmen were imitating pre-Islamic designs. In addition to the various decorative details, the building has ablaq masonry of alternating beige and tawny colours.

== Madrasa-mosque (western building) ==
The western building served as a Friday mosque but is also described as a madrasa or madrasa-mosque. It has a four-iwan layout around a central court, which was characteristic of late Mamluk architecture. The central courtyard is open to the sky and was originally covered with a netting to prevent birds from flying inside. The eastern iwan is oriented towards the qibla (direction of prayer) and containing the mihrab and minbar of the mosque, while the western iwan at the back serves as the women's section today. A balcony in the back wall also served as a dikka. The northern and southern iwans, along the sides, are much smaller and shallower. The annexes of the building include 18 living units which were reserved for staff.

The interior is richly paved and paneled with black and white marble across the floors and along dadoes of the lower walls. Along the top edge of the dadoes, all around the courtyard, runs a fine and ornate Kufic Arabic inscription inscribed with black bitumen inset into a white marble background. The walls above this, especially around the large arches of the iwans, are carved with arabesque motifs and other Arabic inscriptions. The spandrels of the northern and southern iwan arches feature central medallions carved with the epigraphic blazon of Sultan al-Ghuri. The mihrab niche, as usual, is one of the most richly decorated elements and features radiating patterns of black and white marble mosaics around its semi-dome and geometric marble mosaics covering the middle section of the niche. The wall on either side of it is also covered in marble mosaic paneling much like the qibla wall of the older al-Mu'ayyad Mosque.

The huge minaret is visible from near Bab Zuwayla, and is a four storied rectangular tower of a considerable height. The uppermost part of the tower had a four-headed or quadruple-lantern structure and was the first of its kind to be built in Cairo. It was probably built in stone originally but was rebuilt in brick soon after its construction due to structural problems. It was originally covered in blue tiles. This upper section in brick collapsed in the 19th century and was replaced with the present five-headed pinnacle. The balustrades of the balconies have also been replaced with simple wooden versions.

Madrasa-Mosque

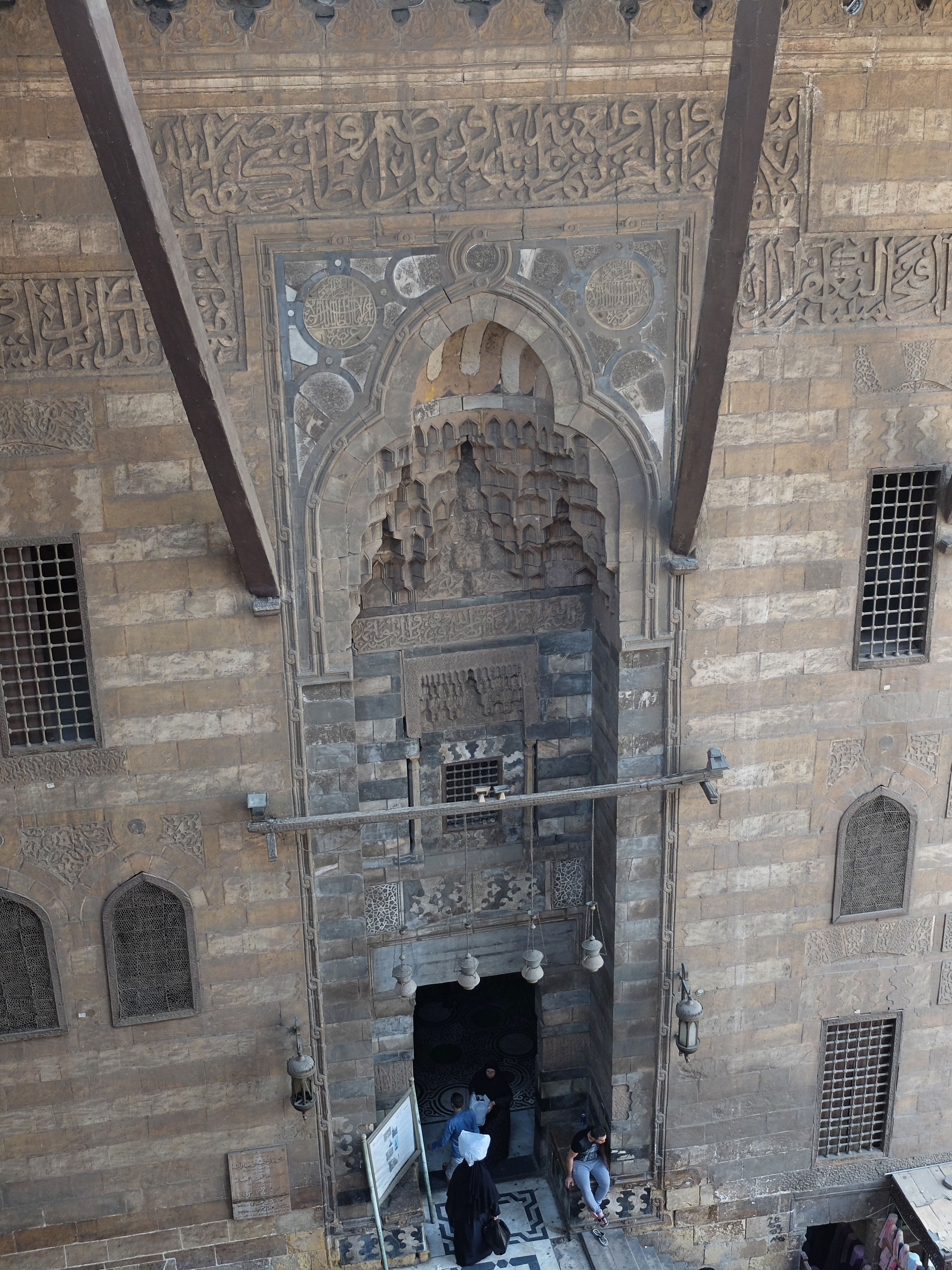
Entrance portal of the mosque

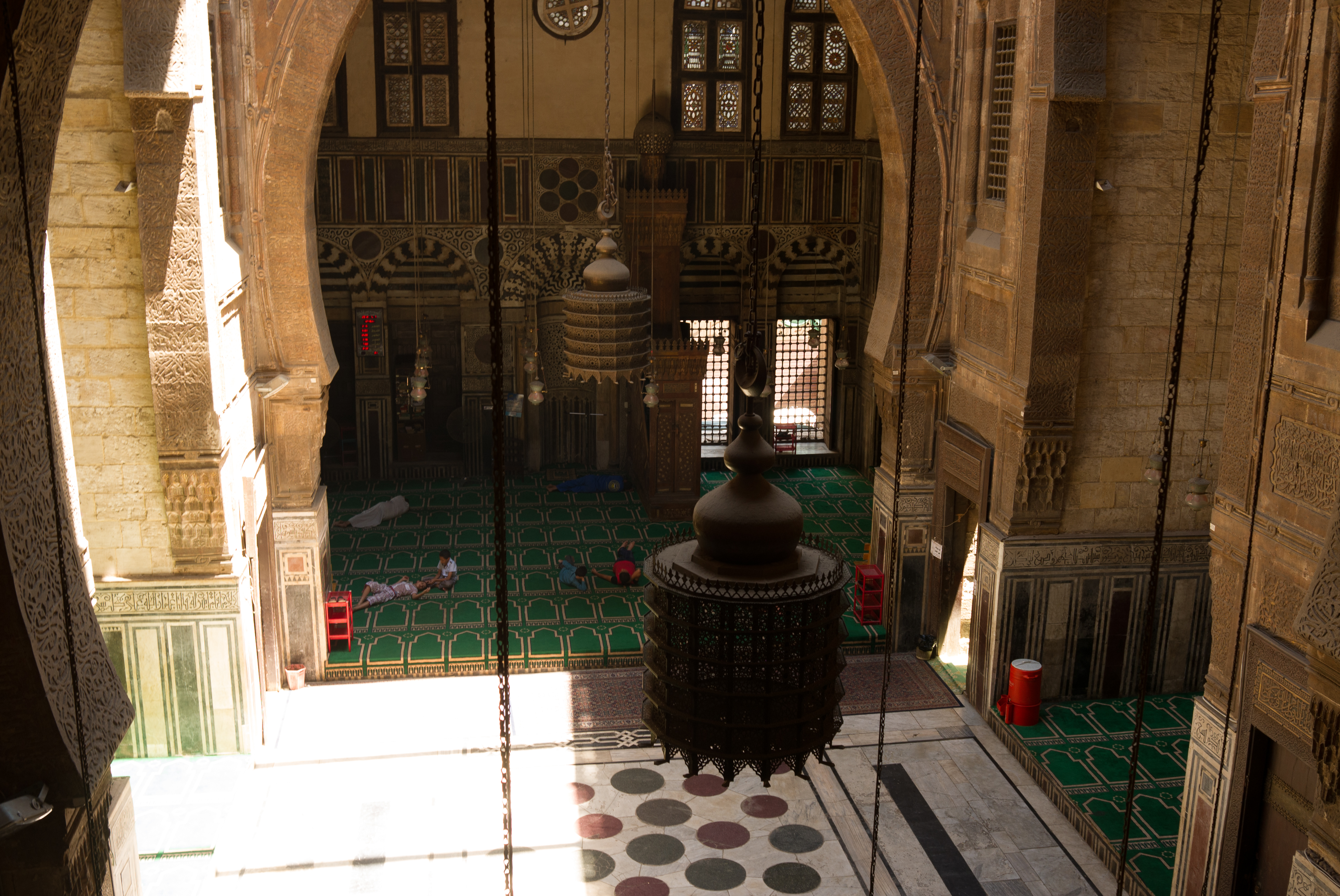
The interior of the mosque, looking over the central courtyard

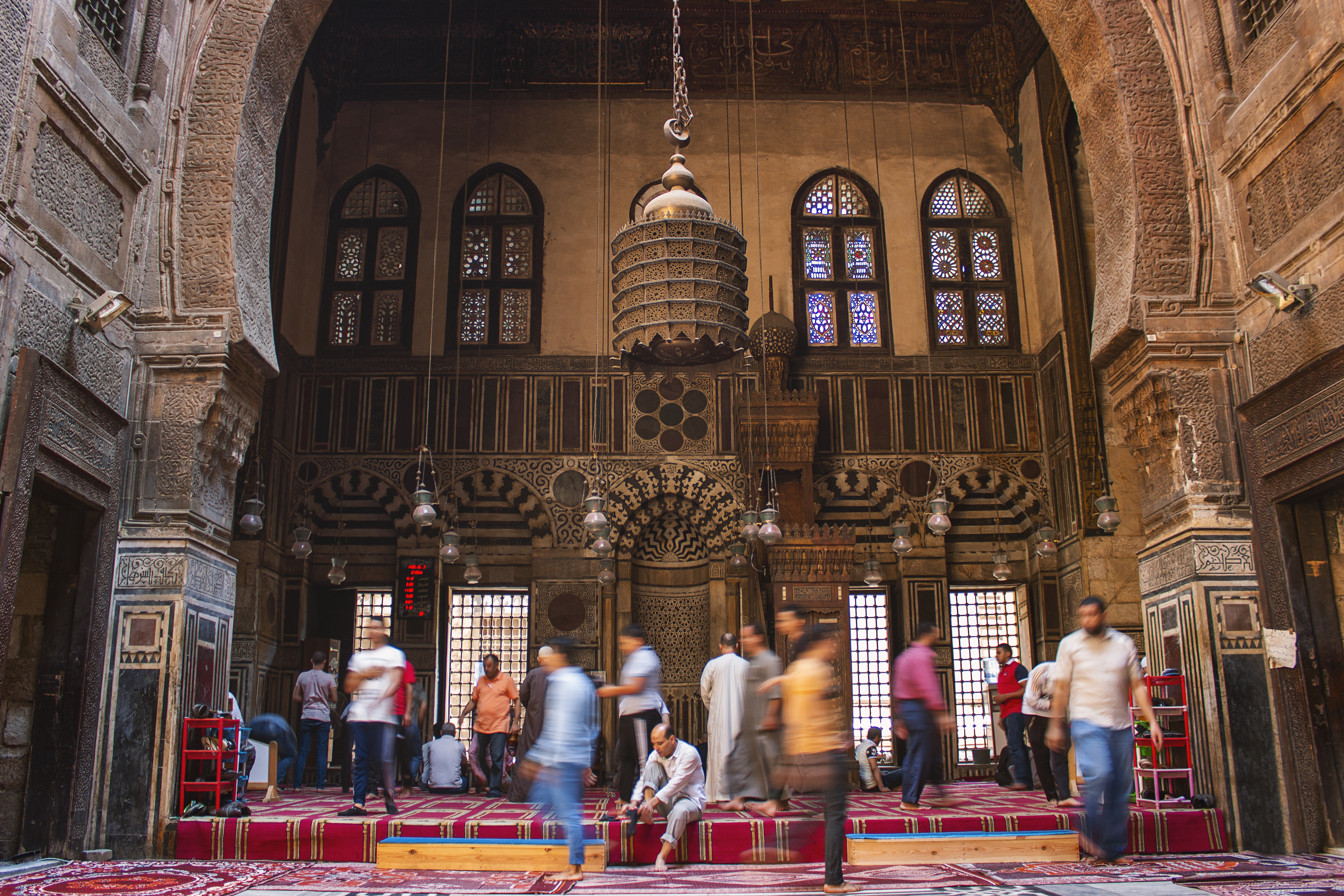
The qibla iwan (east side of the courtyard)

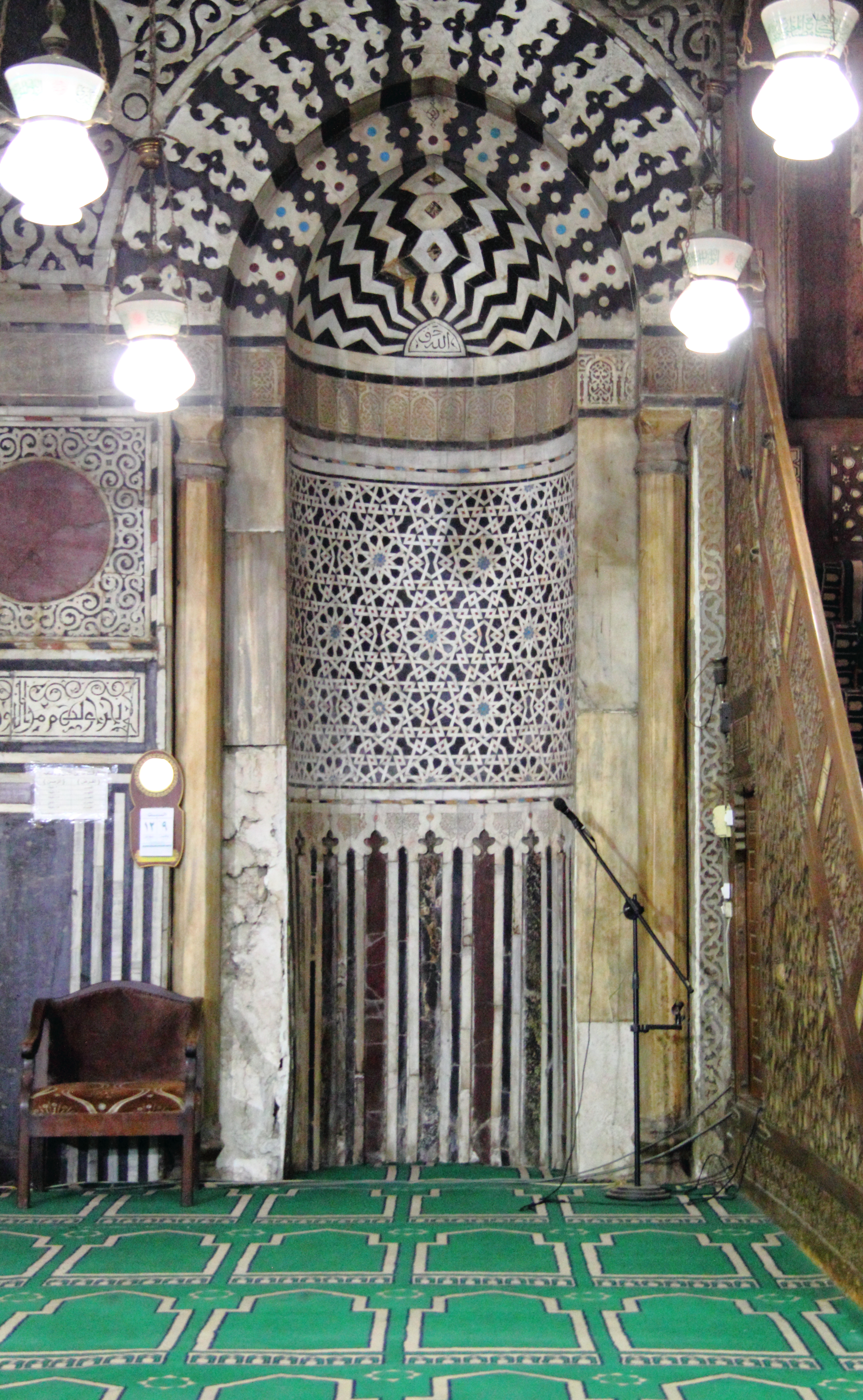
The mihrab of the mosque

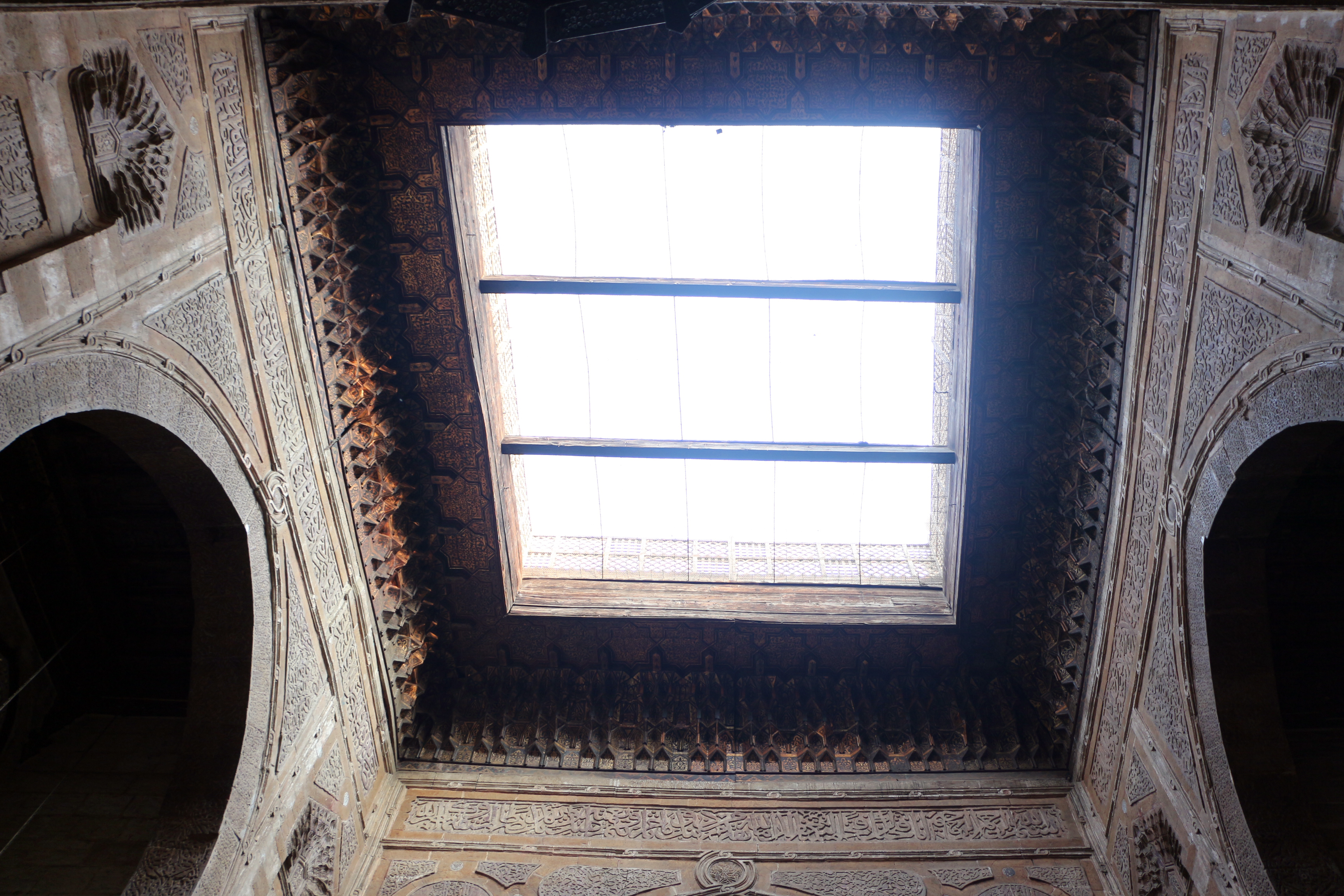
Looking up from the courtyard: a cornice of muqarnas runs along the top edge of the courtyard and stone-carved arabesque patterns decorate the walls.

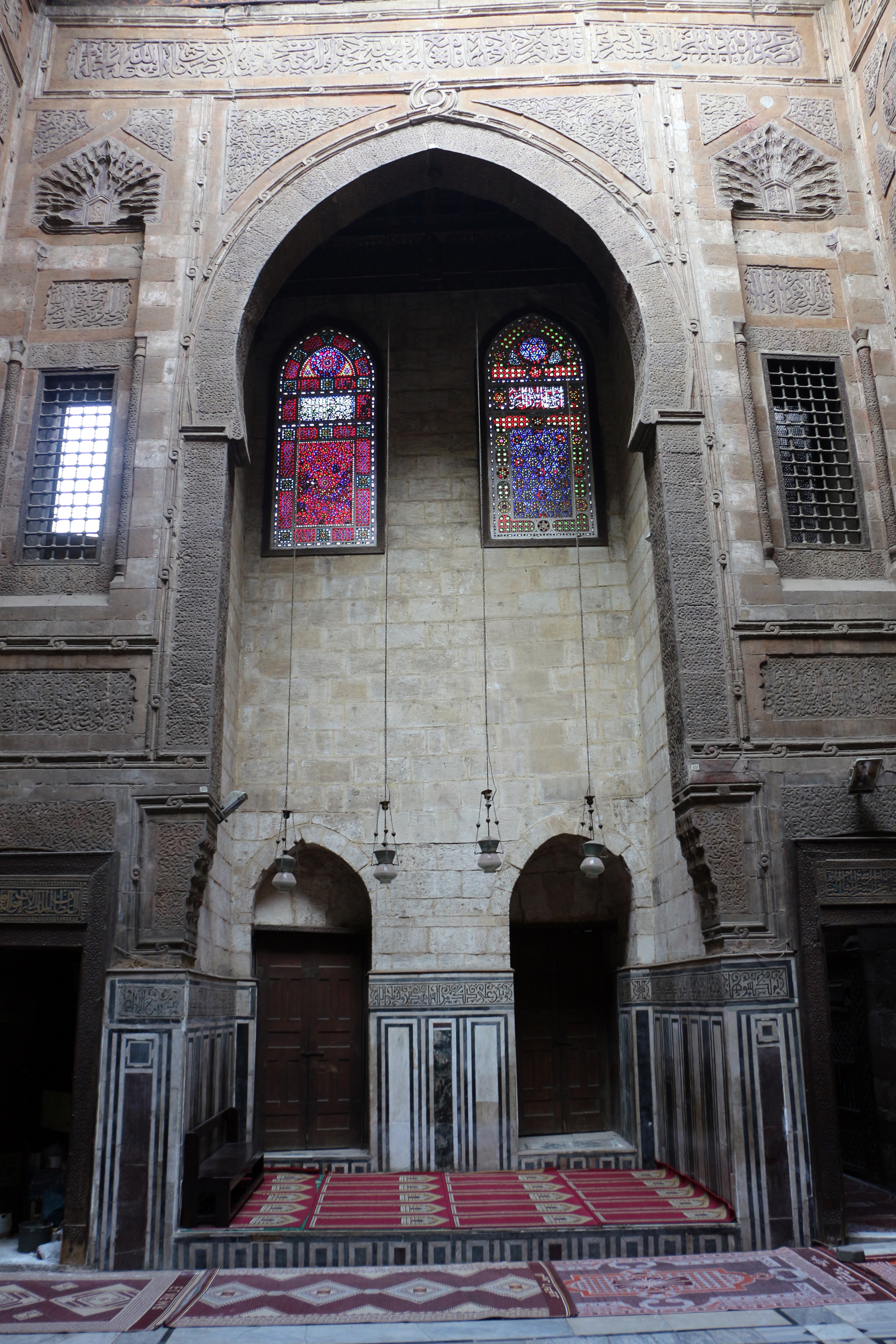
One of the lateral iwans of the main courtyard (north side)

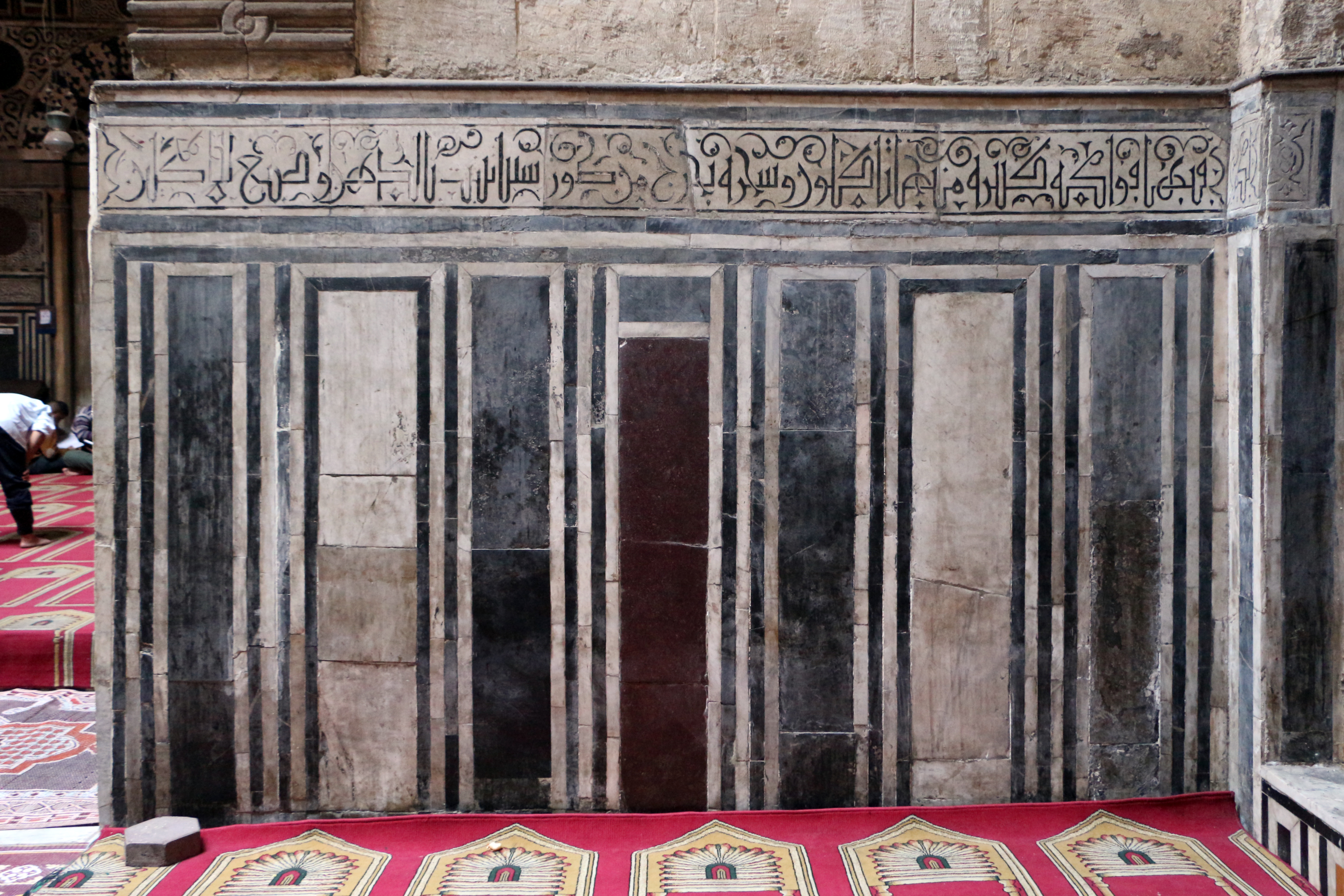
Marble mosaic panels and marble inscription band (in Kufic Arabic script) along the walls of the main courtyard

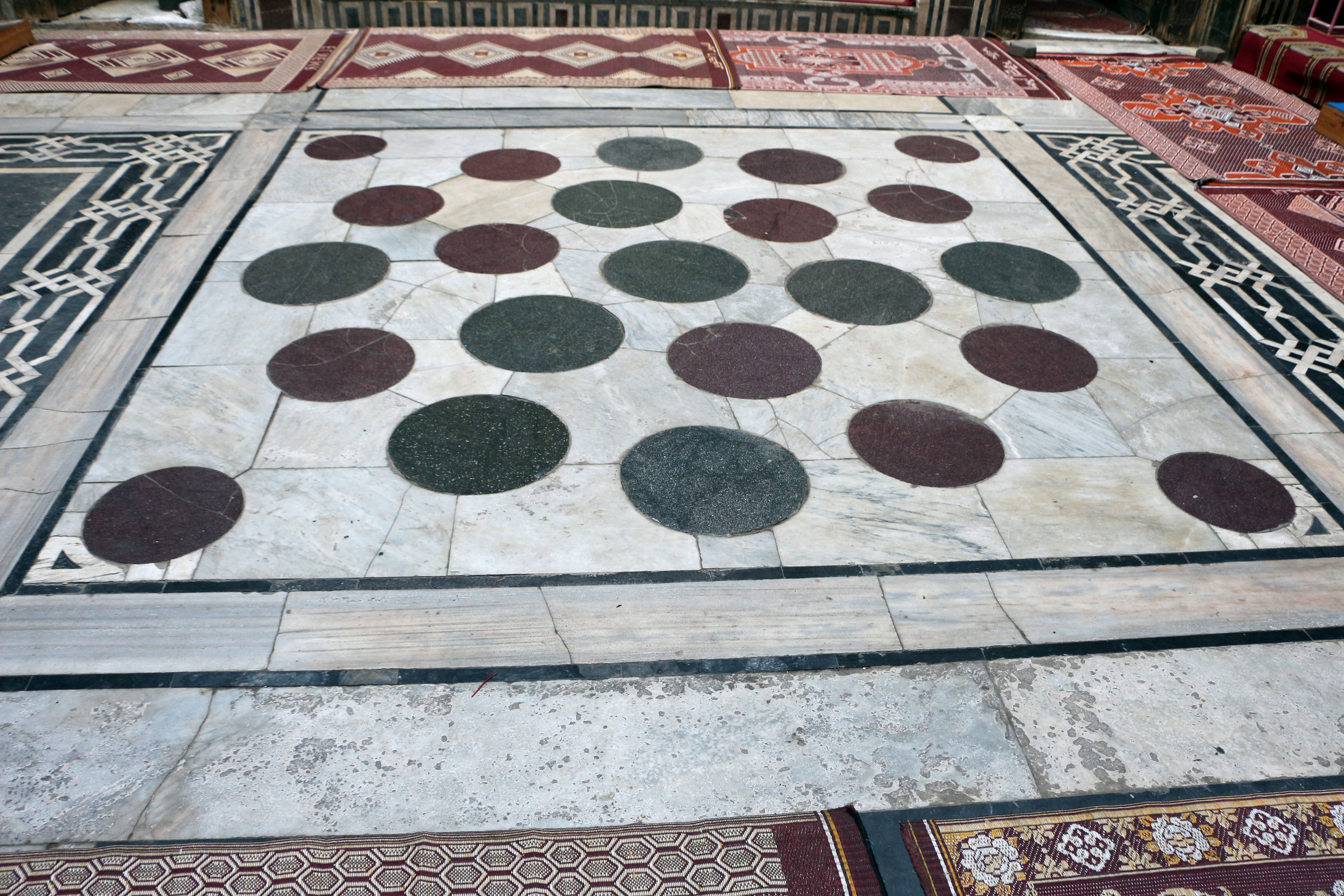
Example of marble mosaic pavement in the courtyard

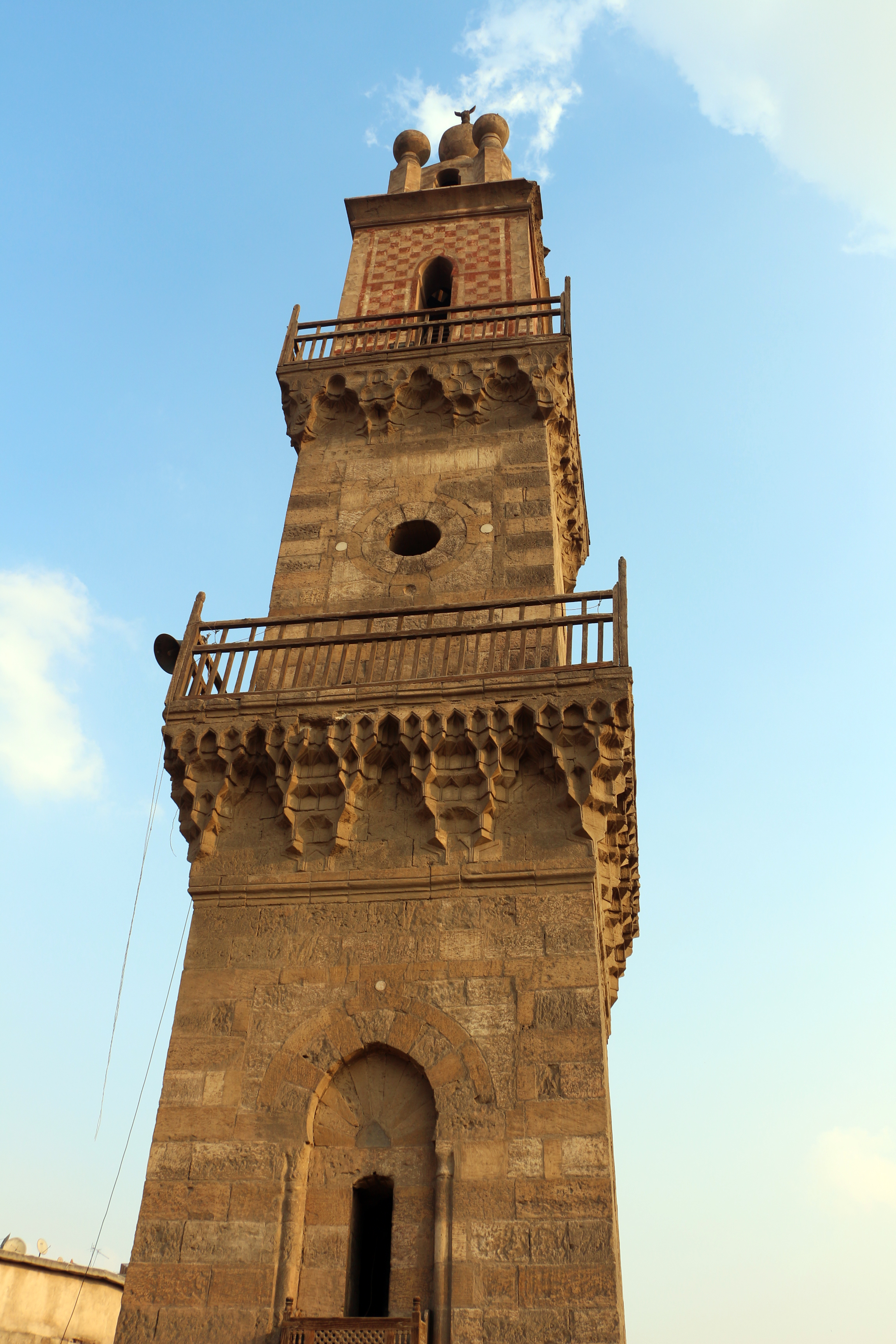
The minaret, built above the mosque

== Khanqah-mausoleum (eastern building) ==
=== The khanqah and other annexes ===
The main facade of the funerary compound is paneled with recesses crowned with a rectangular muqarnas crest, unlike the mosque façade. The main portal leads to an unusual vestibule with two opposite entrances, each with its own trilobed portals. the one on the right-hand side leading to the mausoleum and the other to the khanqah. On the northwestern corner is a sabil-kuttab which projects outward into the street. The sabil, distinguished by its large metal grille windows, is located on the ground floor while the kuttab, with double-arched windows, is built above it. This sabil-kuttab configuration had first appeared in the reign of Sultan Qaytbay (r. 1468-1496).

Today visitors enter the building through a side entrance to the north on Sharia al-Azhar, instead of through the historic main portal on al-Muizz street. This leads to an internal open air-courtyard which gives access to the different parts of the complex and which formerly contained a graveyard for members of al-Ghuri's family. On the south side, behind a decorated façade with rows of windows and an elaborate cornice of muqarnas, is an enclosed maq'ad or qa'a, a reception hall. This hall was reserved for female members of the sultan's family when visiting the complex. To the southwest is the mausoleum chamber, while to the west is the khanqah.

Khanqah-Mausoleum: exterior, vestibule, and courtyard

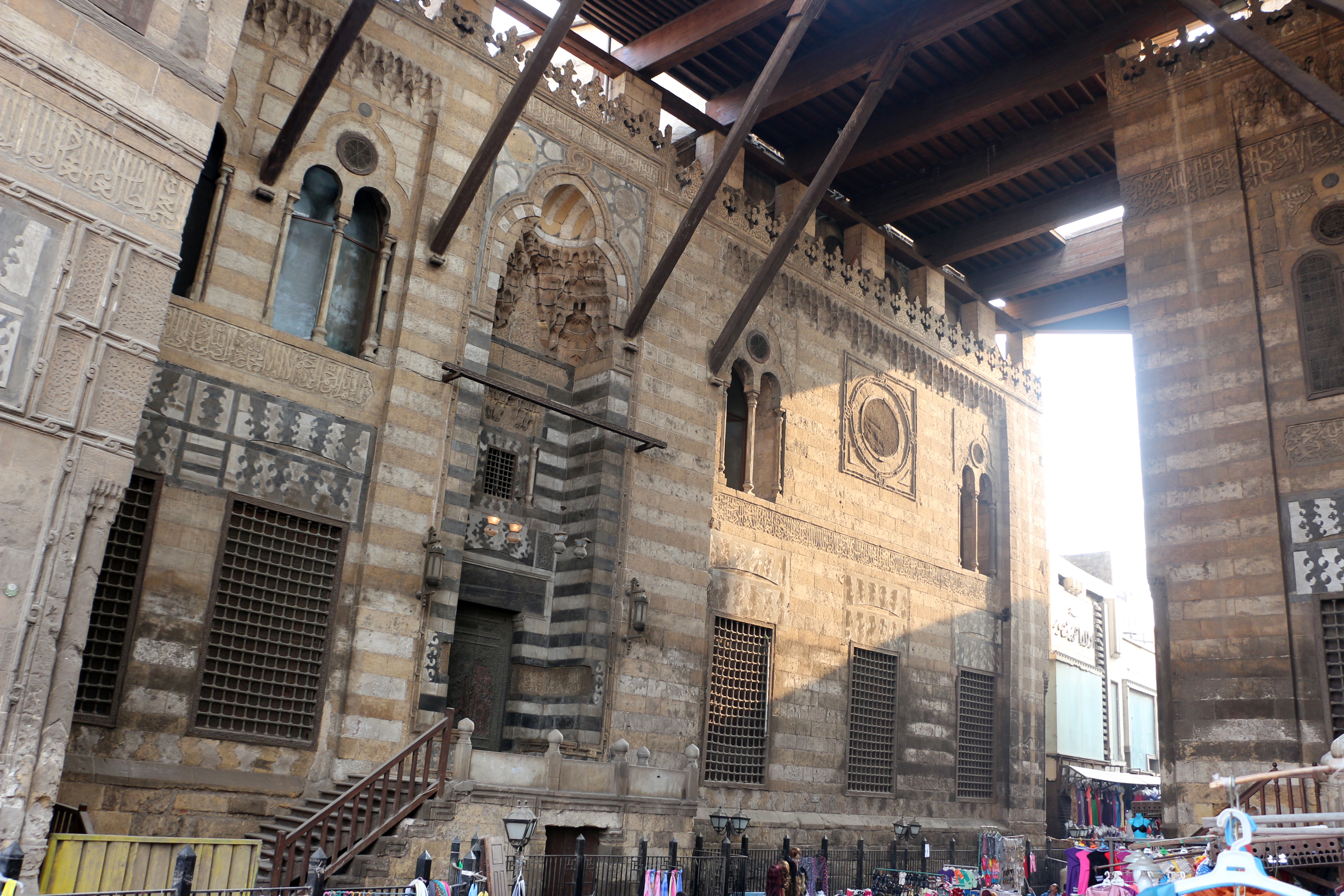
The facade of the khanqah-mausoleum, on the east side of the street

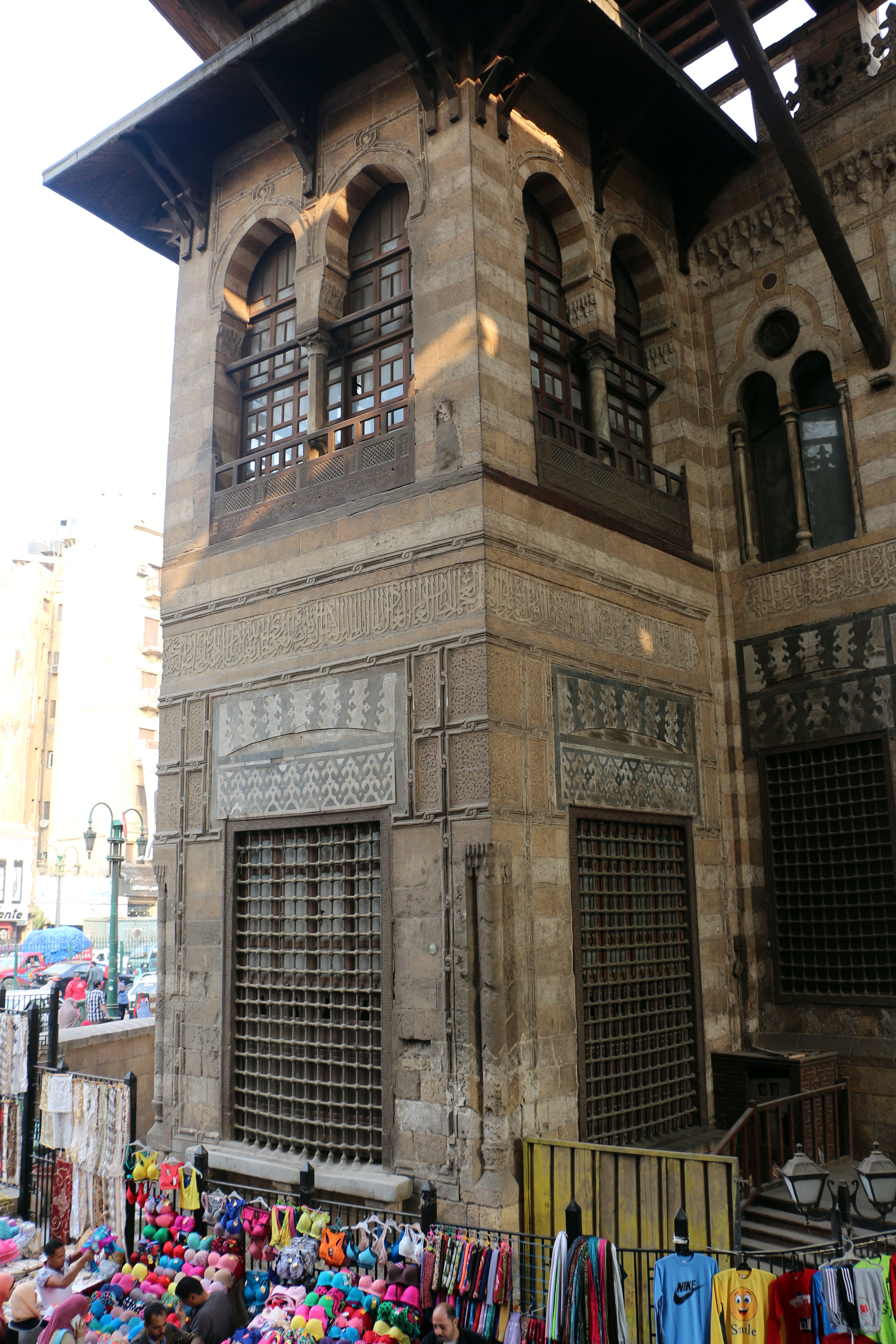
Sabil (above) and kuttab (below) projecting from the northwestern corner of the khanqah

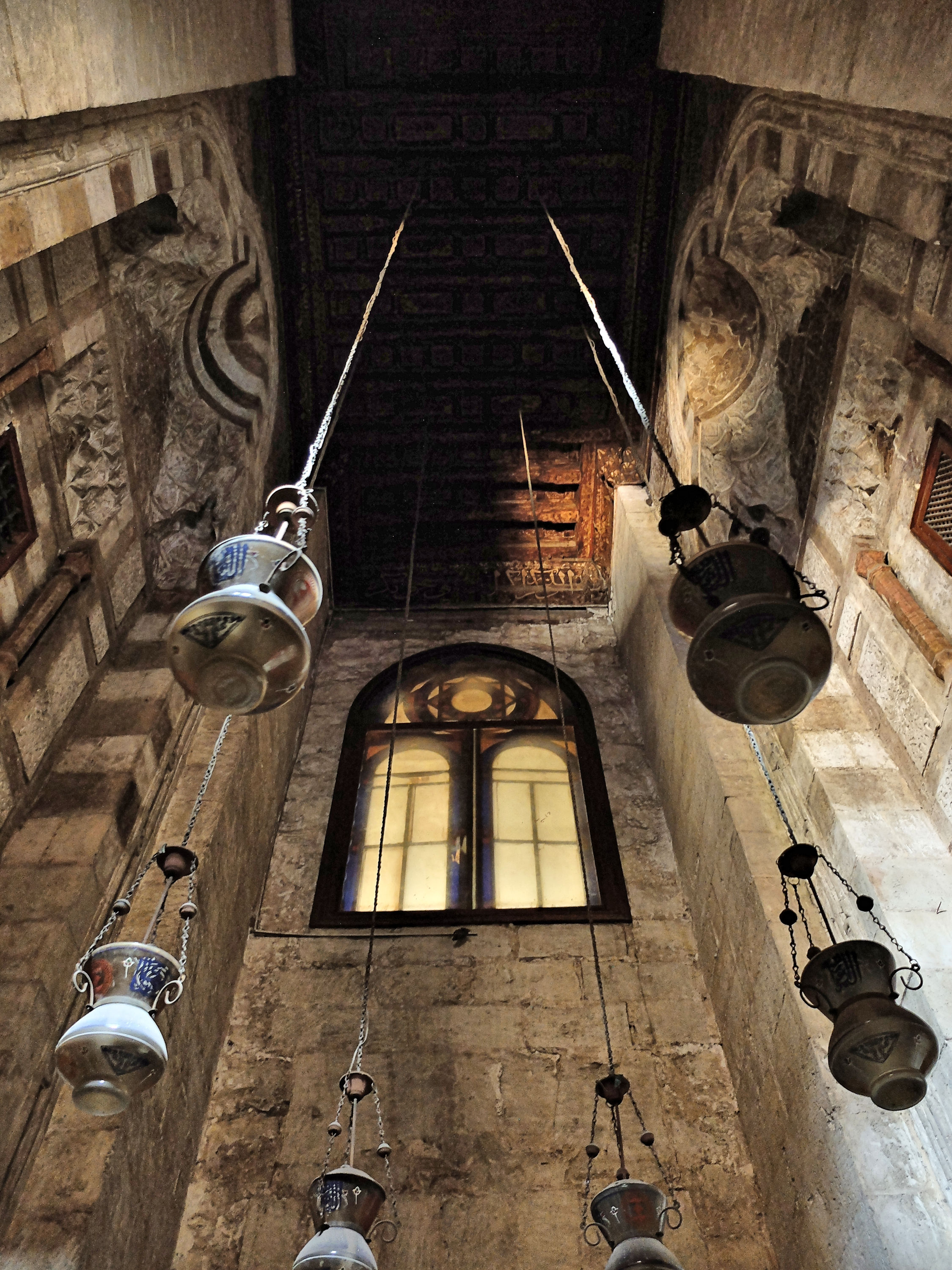
The vestibule behind the main entrance, with decorated portals to the khanqah (left) and the mausoleum (right)

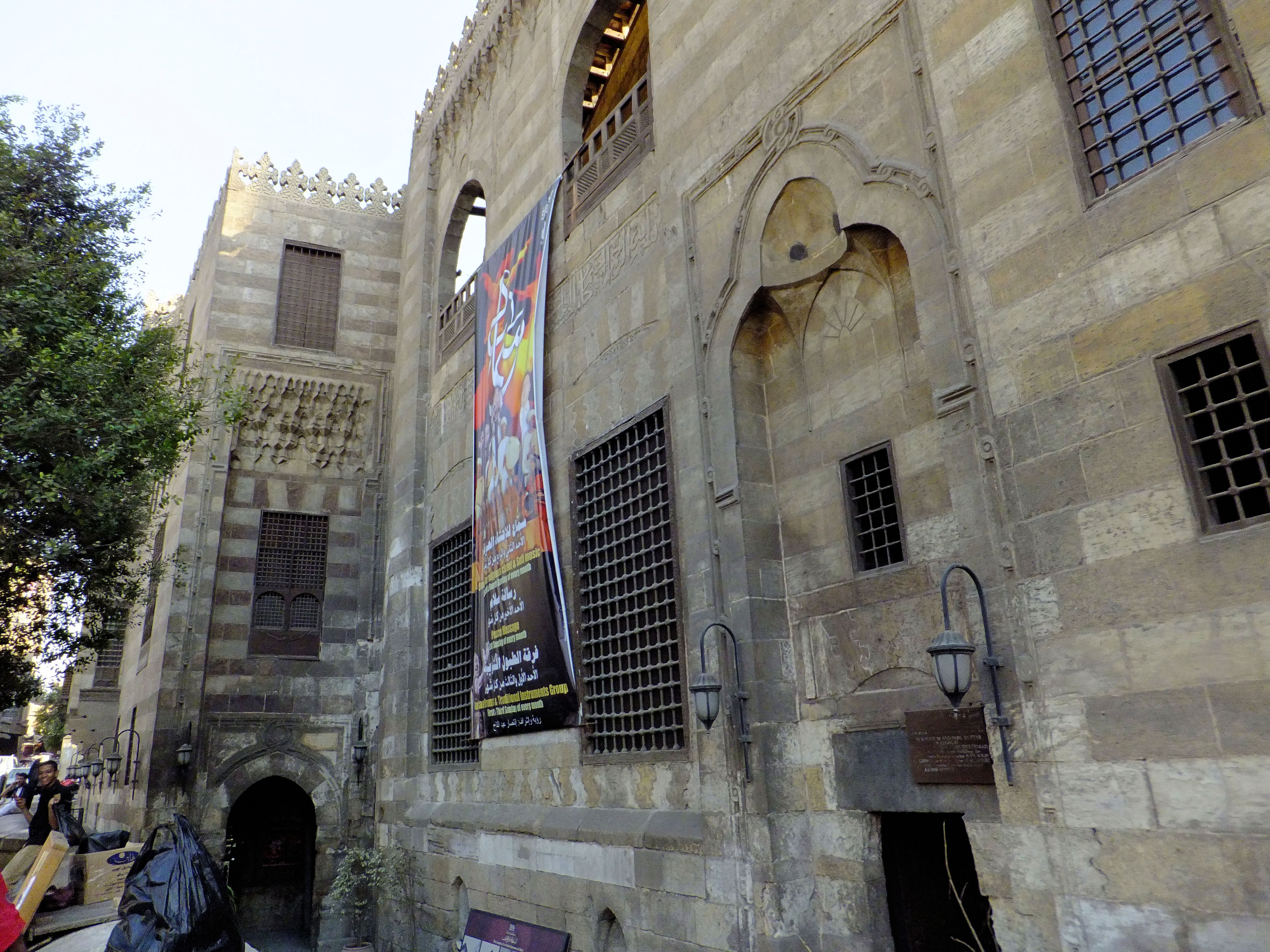
Northern street façade of the complex, including the visitor entrance today (left)

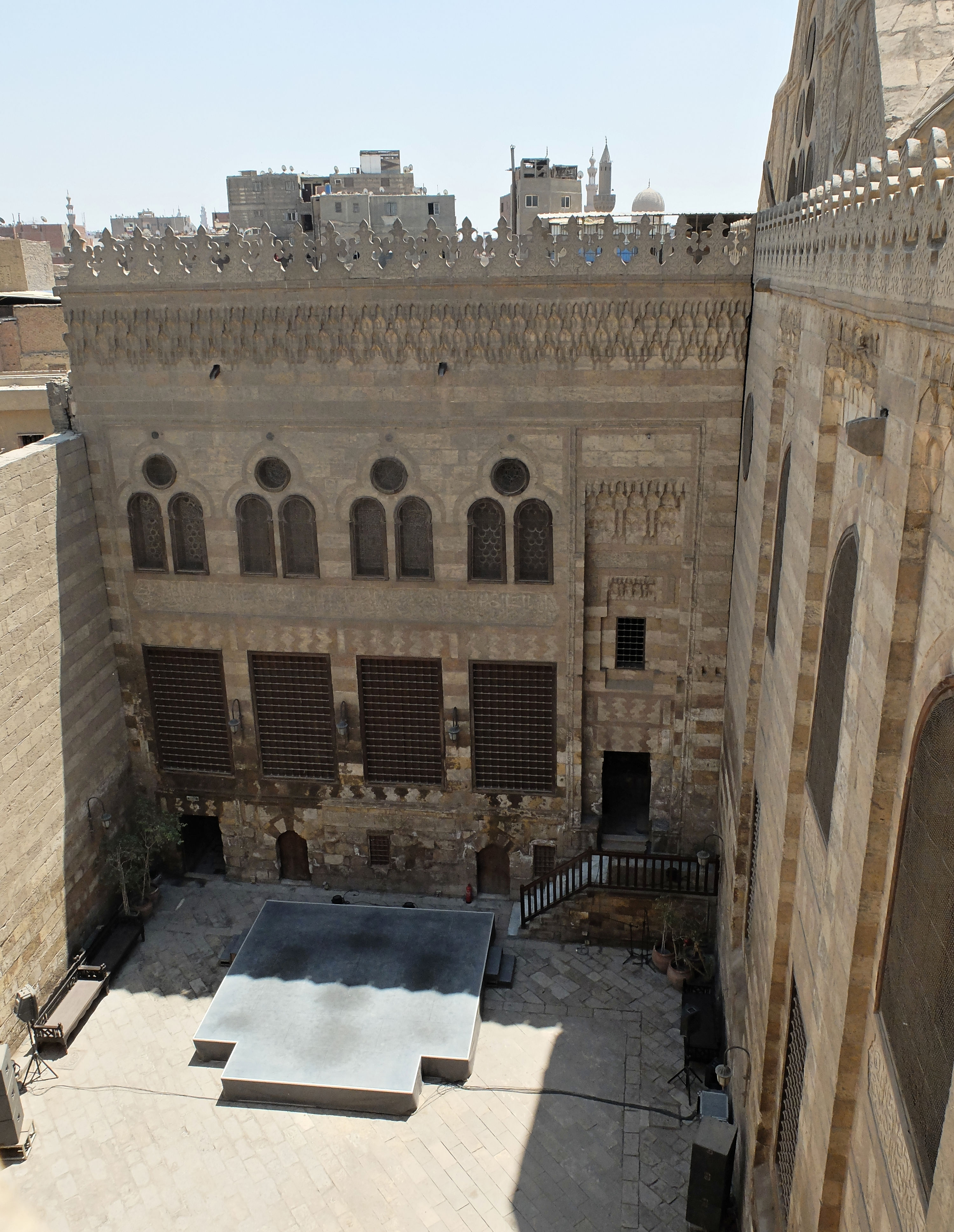
Internal courtyard of the khanqah-mausoleum

The khanqah is a T-shaped hall which was used for Sufi gatherings and ceremonies, namely such as the dhikr. It had a mihrab on its western side, with its own pattern of marble decoration. Marble dadoes along the lowers walls and marble pavements also decorate the hall. Although the waqf deed describes it as a khanqah, this part of the building lacked the traditional sleeping quarters and living accommodations that were traditionally part of khanqahs. (Although accommodations for staff did exist in the western building on the other side of the street.)

Khanqah hall

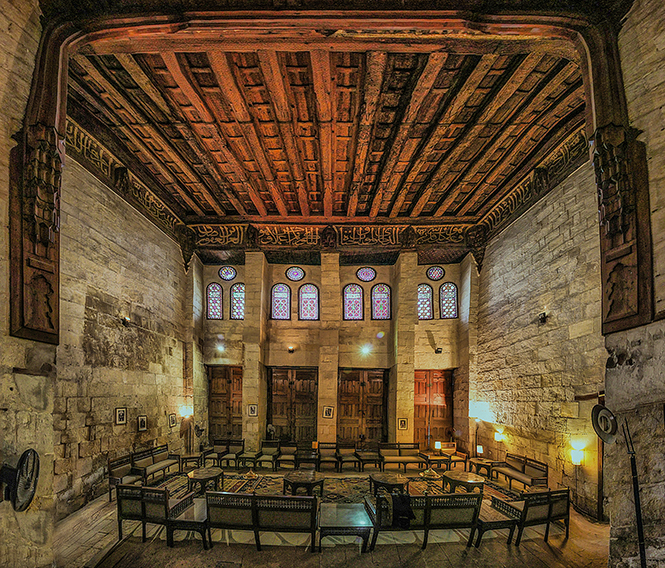
A section of the main hall of the khanqah, where Sufi gatherings took place

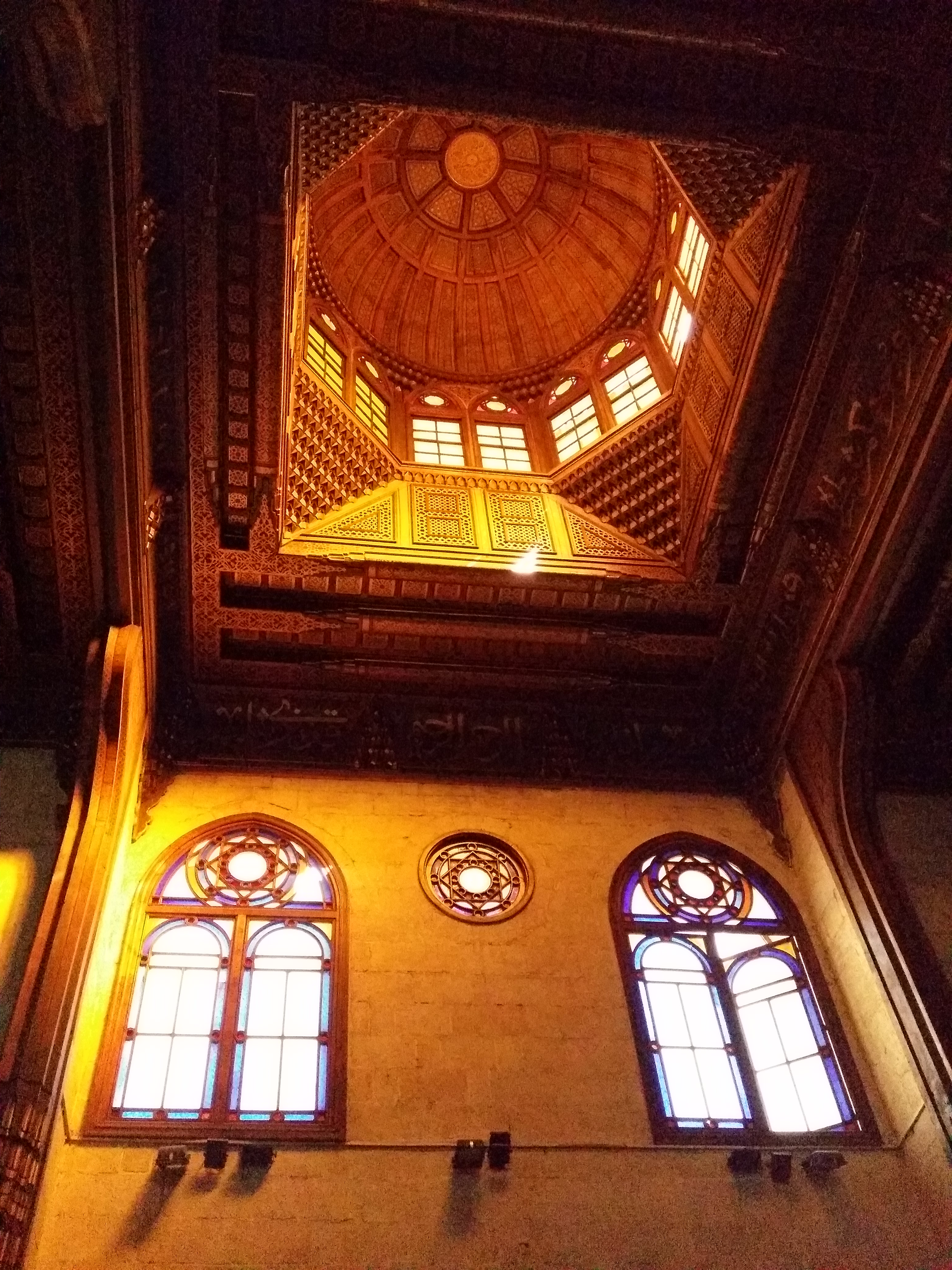
The wooden dome above the main hall of the khanqah

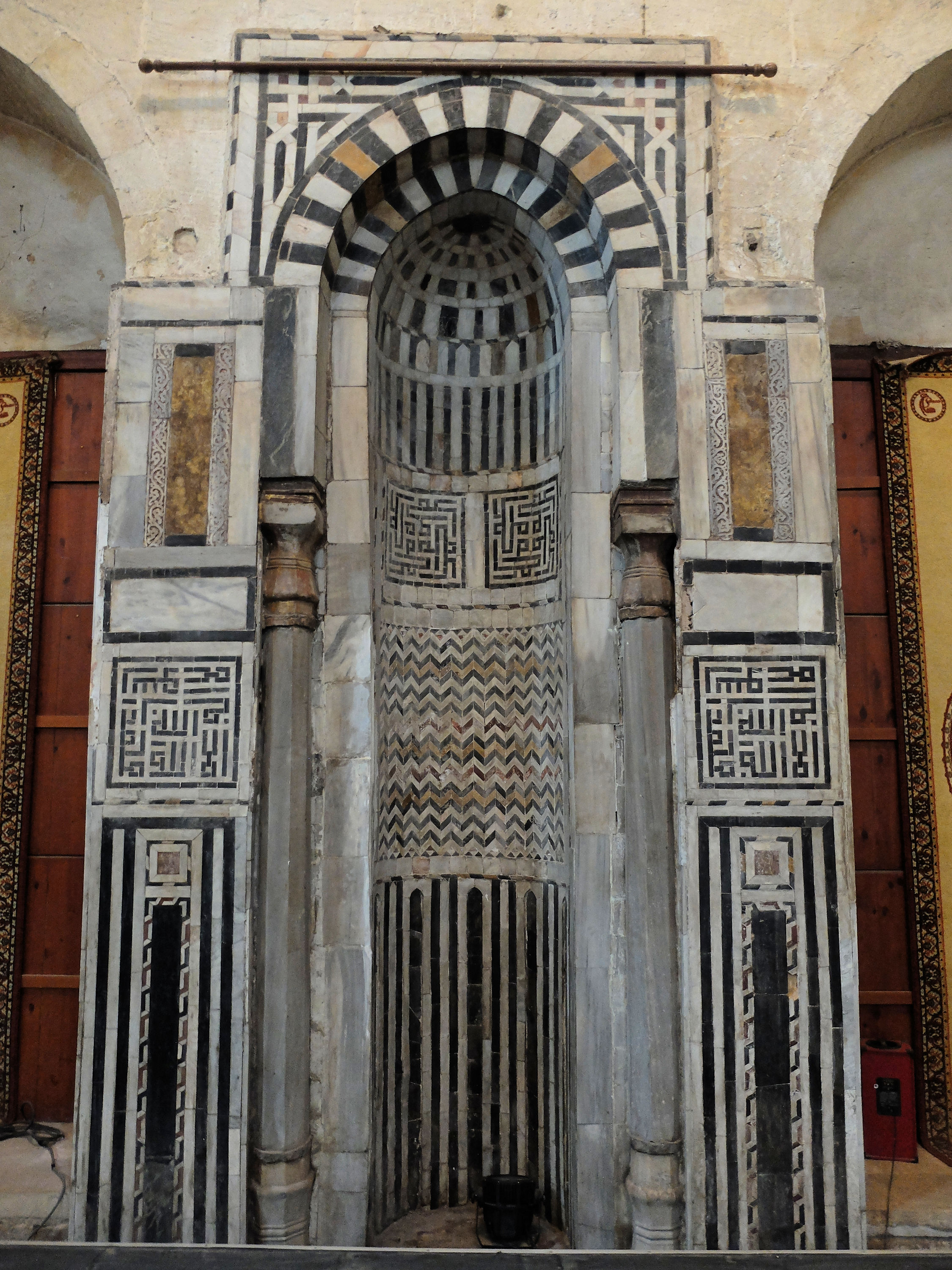
The mihrab of the khanqah

A passageway from the khanqah leads to the sabil. The sabil chamber has a marble salsabil and a polychrome marble pavement displaying a dense composition of twenty-pointed geometric stars, one of the most elaborate examples of its kind in Cairo. A staircase leads to the kuttab on the upper floor.

Sabil and kuttab interiors

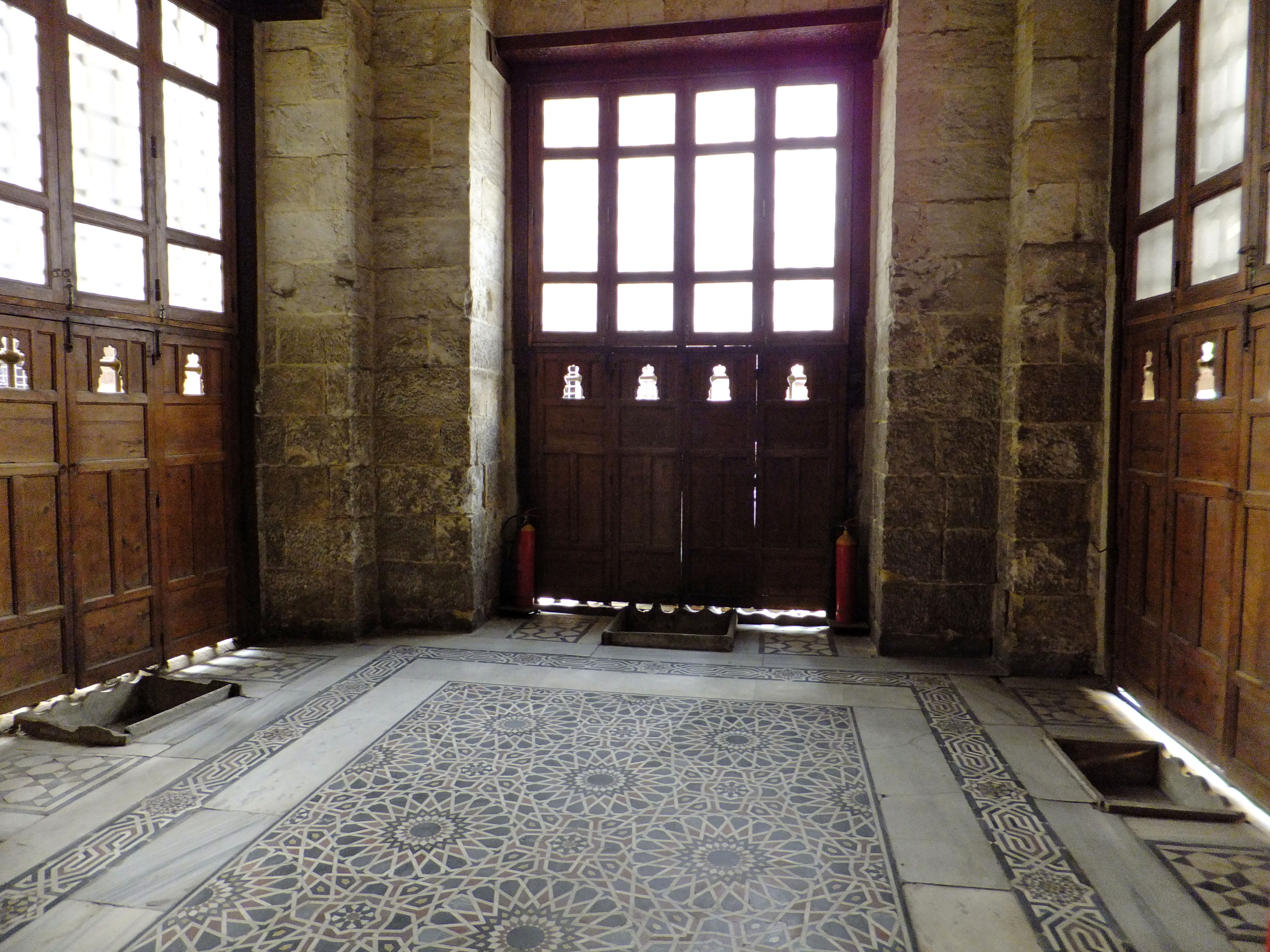
Interior of the sabil, with marble mosaic pavement in geometric star motifs

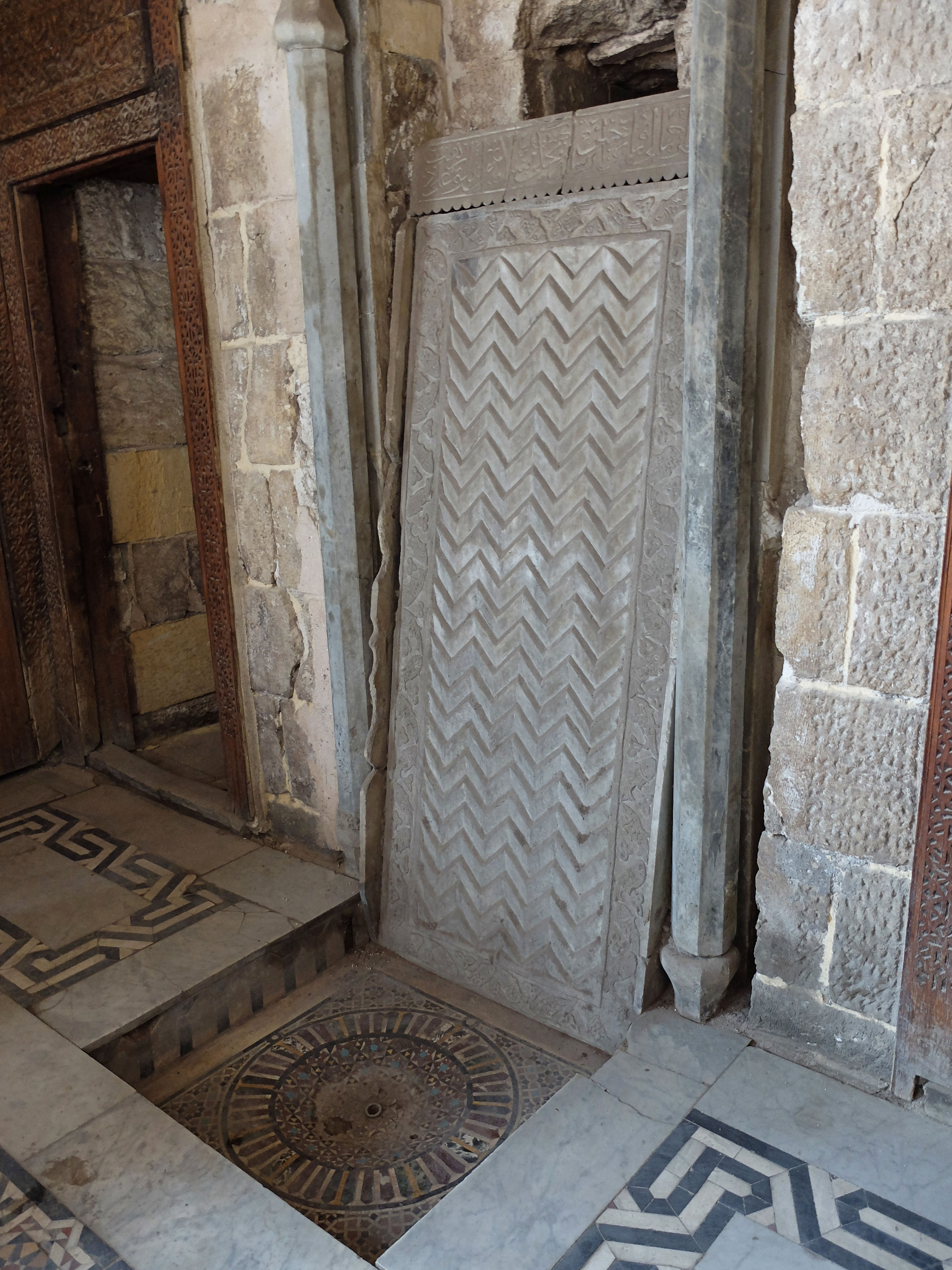
The marble salsabil inside the sabil room

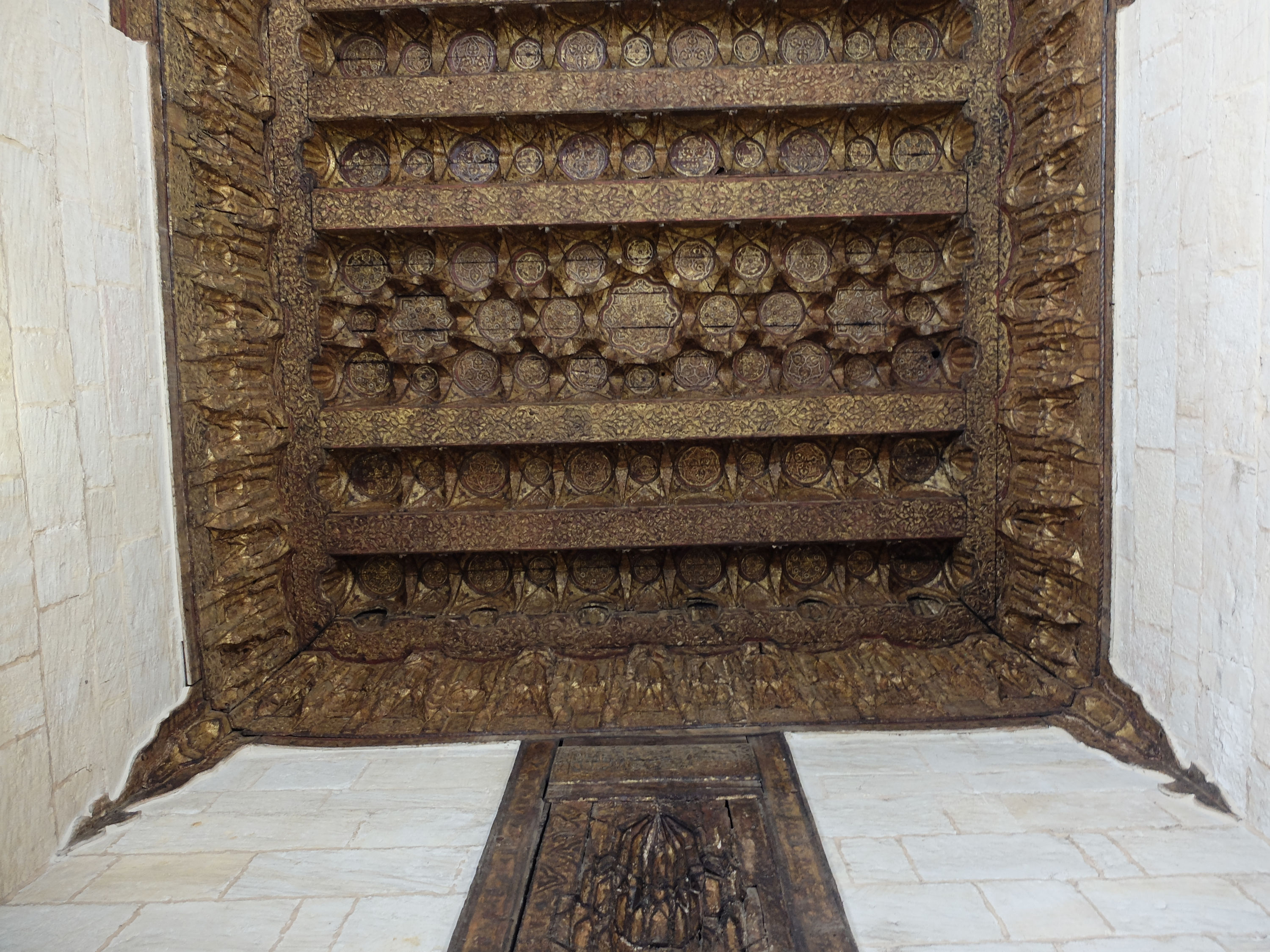
Decorated wooden ceiling inside the sabil

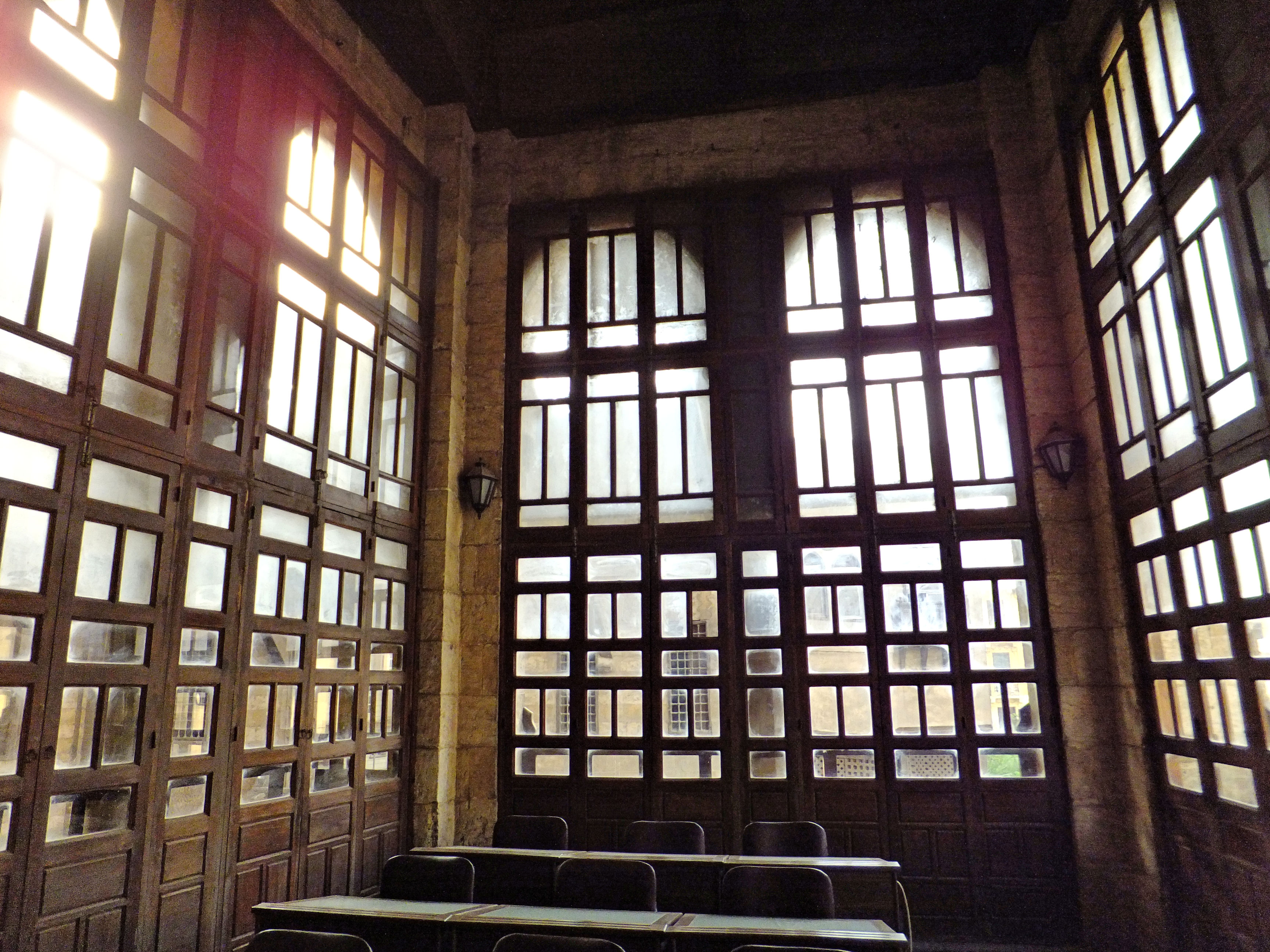
Interior of the kuttab on the upper floor

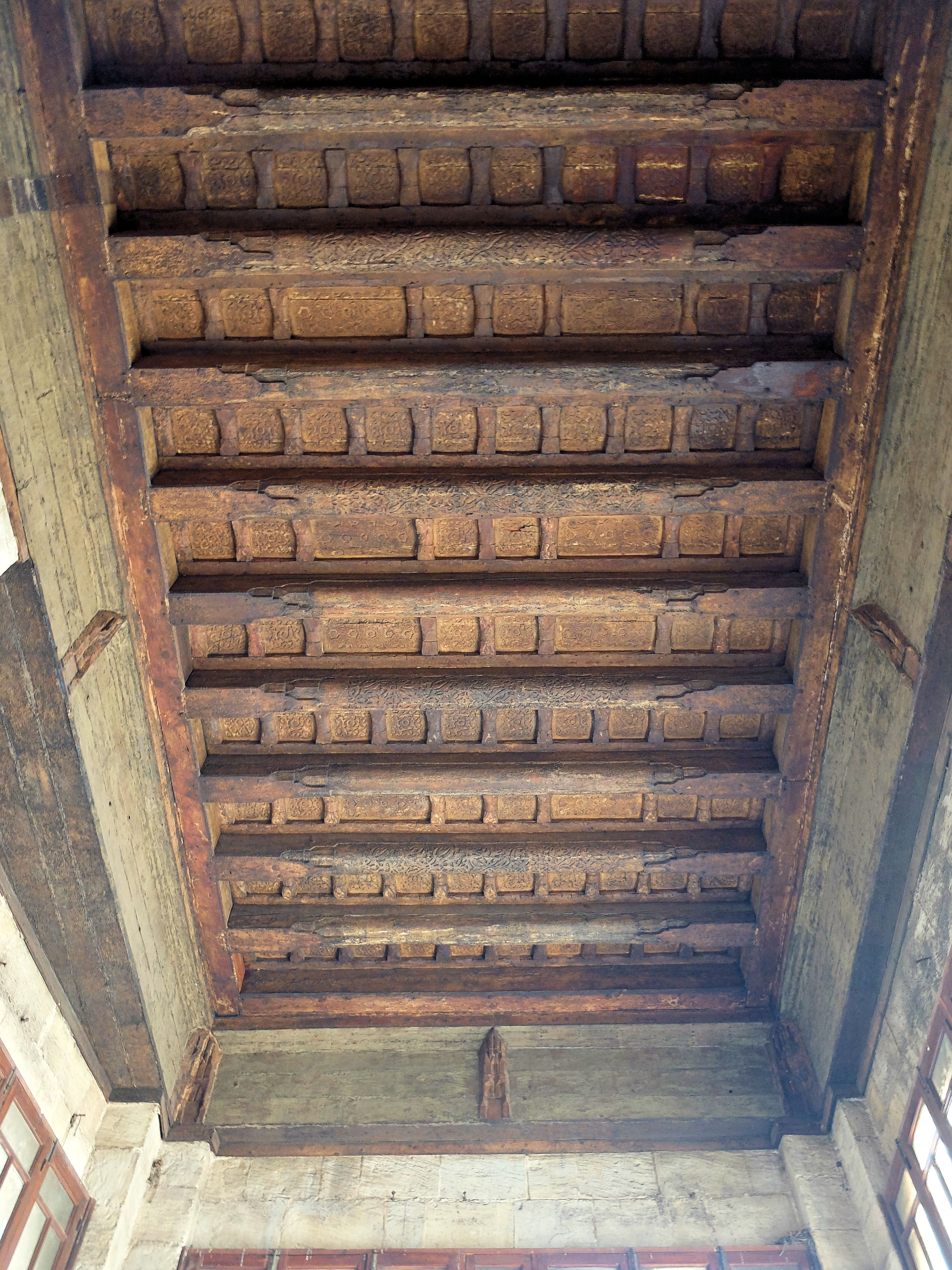
Ceiling of the kuttab chamber

=== The mausoleum ===
The attachment of the mausoleum to the khanqah instead of the prayer hall was a novelty in Mamluk architecture, and was likely a deliberate decision to allow the mausoleum to occupy a larger and more prominent space in the middle of the city. The mausoleum itself is a large square chamber covered by what was originally a brick dome, today replaced by a flat wooden roof. The dome had a diameter of 12.5 metres (41 ft) and its peak would have originally stood 36 metres (118 ft) high, comparable to the height of the minaret across the street, making it the third-largest dome of the Mamluk period. Its exterior was originally covered in blue tiles described as being of a "lapis lazuli" color. However, the dome was unstable from the beginning and had to be rebuilt at least twice after its initial construction. In 1860 it was finally torn down altogether and replaced with a flat wooden roof, as it is today.

The lower walls of the mausoleum are covered in marble dadoes topped by a calligraphic frieze of black letters inset into marble, similar to the one found in the mosque. Unlike the mosque's version, however, the calligraphy here is a in a fine thuluth script. In addition to this, the chamber features a series of calligraphic compositions carved into vertical black marble panels along the walls, unprecedented in Mamluk art. They include compositions in a mirror configuration as well as in the shapes of vases, trees, and stylized birds. Another marble-decorated mihrab is located in the western wall, again with its own pattern different from the other mihrabs of the complex. On either side of the mihrab are wooden cupboards whose interiors are delicately painted with floral and interlacing patterns. It was likely here that the relics of Muhammad were once kept. The rest of the walls above the marble dadoes are covered in shallow arabesque reliefs, another remarkable feature of the hall. The transition zone between the square chamber and the round dome is achieved through four very long pendentives carved with muqarnas.

Because al-Ghuri's body was never found after the Battle of Marj Dabiq (1516), he was not buried here. Some of his family members were buried here, including his daughter in 1505, followed by his 13-year-old son (Nasir al-Din Muhammad) and his mother. Sultan Tumanbay, who reigned briefly after his death until the Ottomans arrived in Cairo and executed him, was also buried here.

Mausoleum chamber

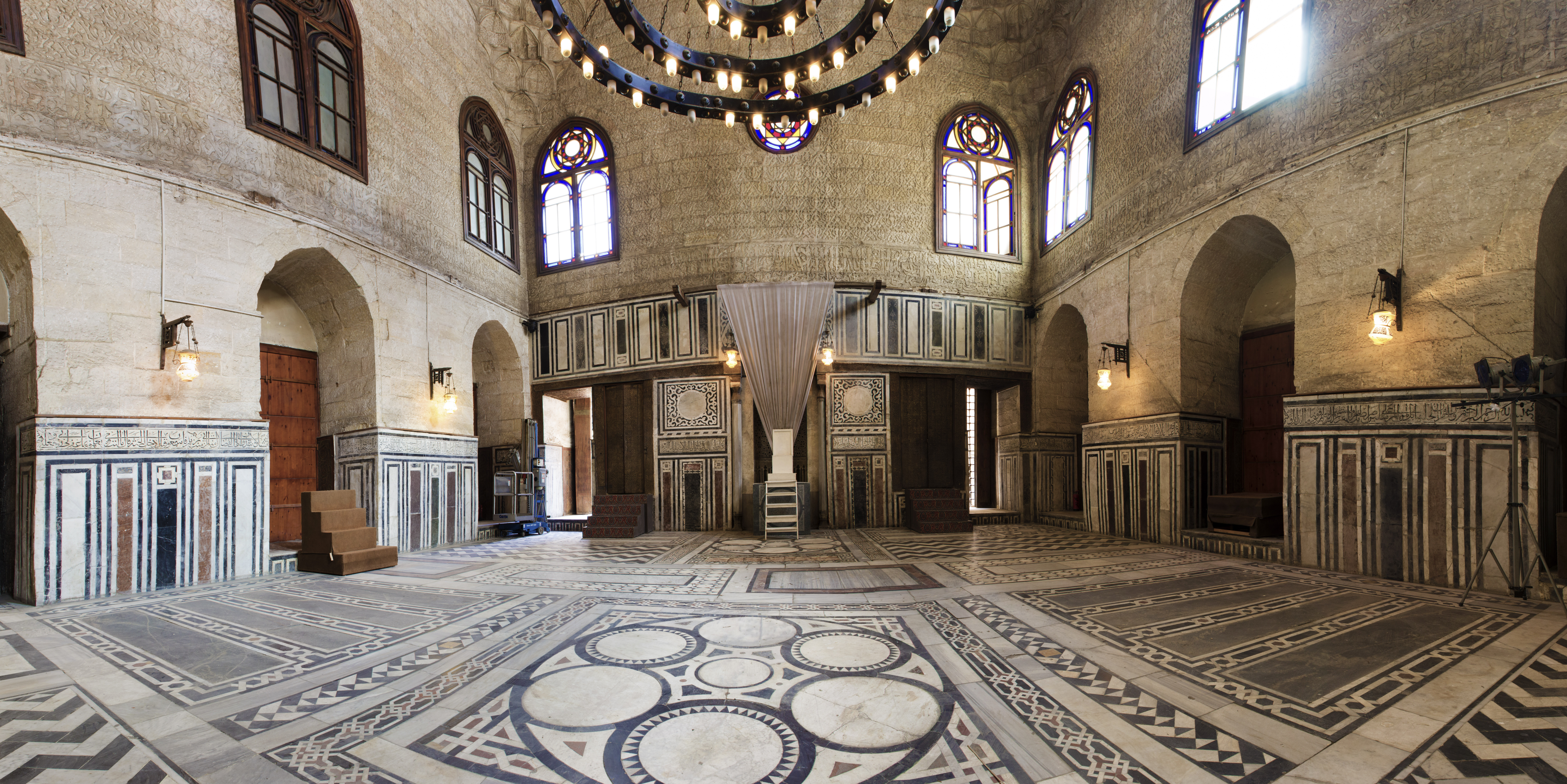
The mausoleum chamber

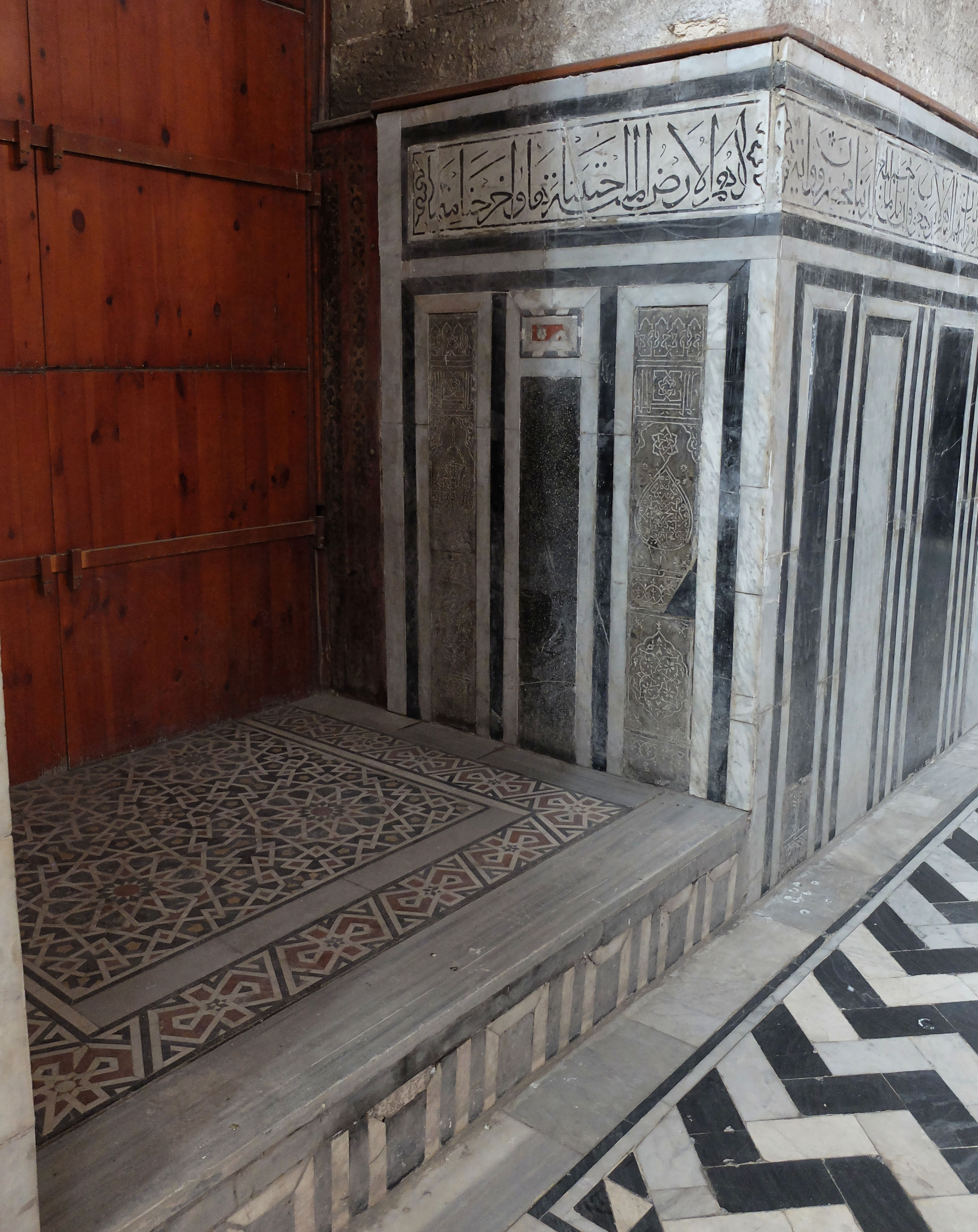
Marble dado and thuluth inscription along the lower walls of the mausoleum

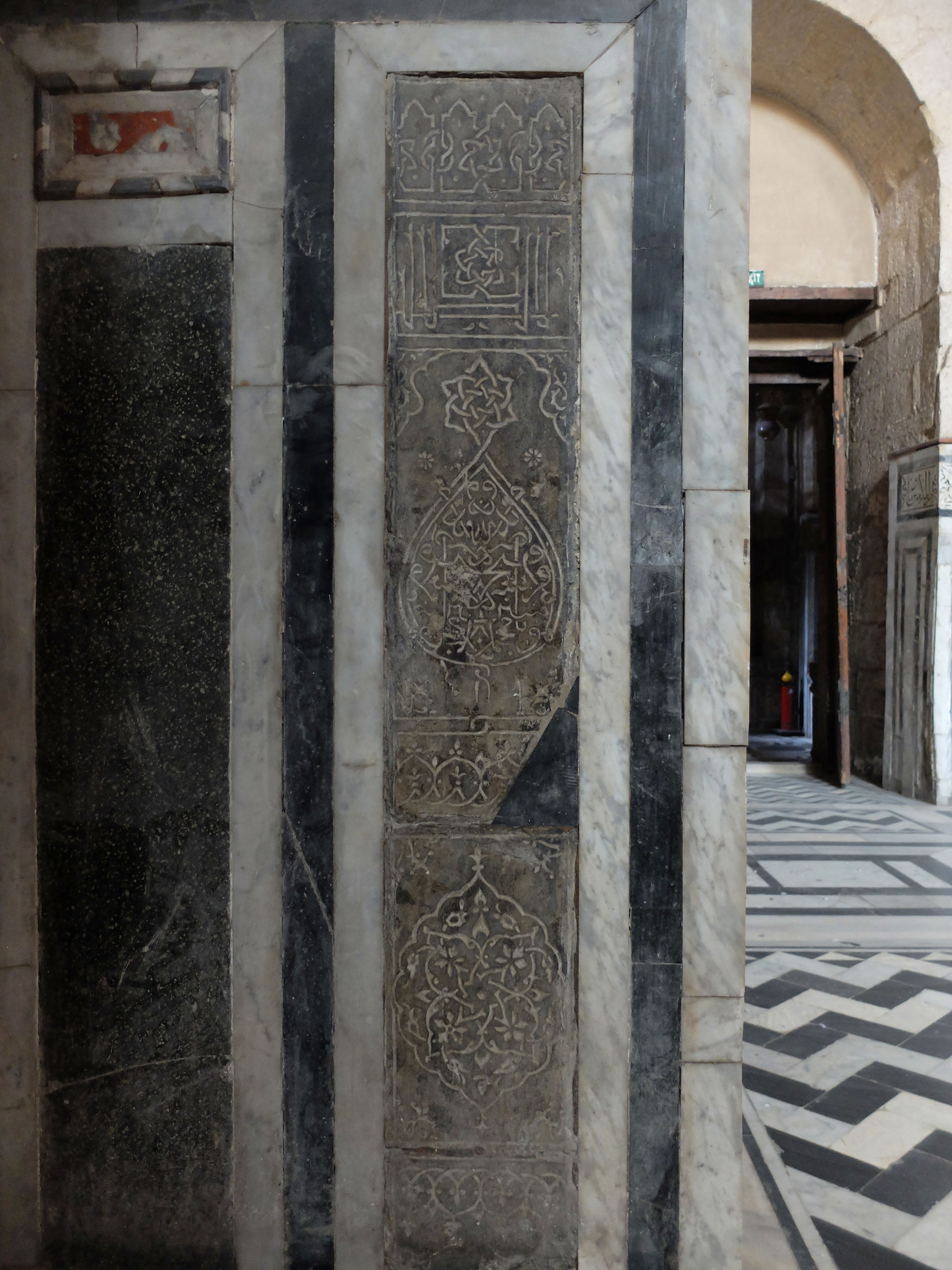
Black marble panels with finely carved calligraphic compositions, a feature not found in earlier Mamluk architecture

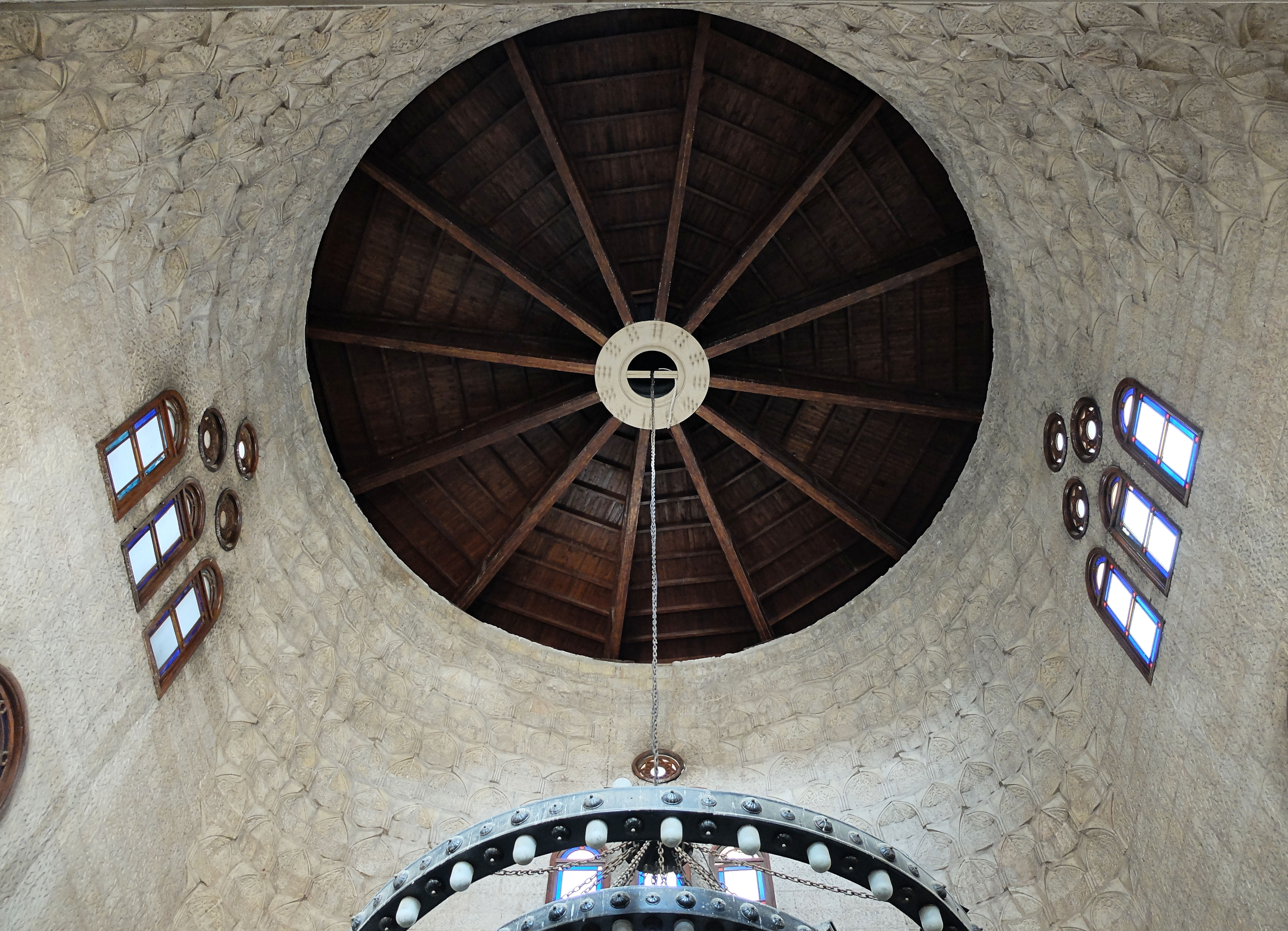
The dome of the mausoleum chamber (now replaced by a flat wooden roof, but preserving the stone pendentives)

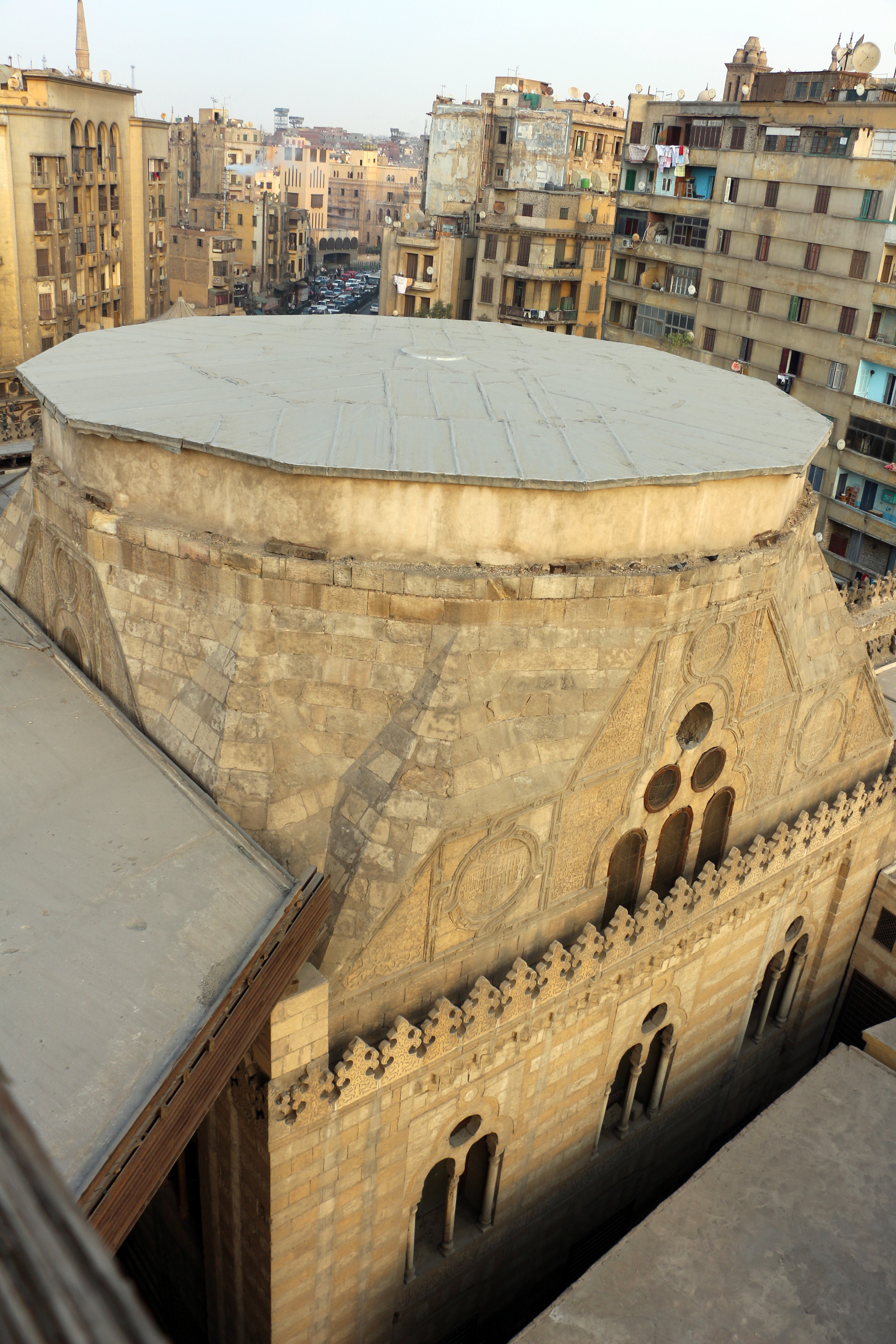
The drum of the dome above the mausoleum

== See also ==
- Islam in Egypt
- List of madrasas in Egypt
- List of mausoleums in Egypt
- List of mosques in Cairo
- Late medieval domes
