= Bab Zuwayla =

Gate in the wall of the Old City of Cairo, Egypt

Coordinates: 30°2′34.17″N 31°15′28.07″E

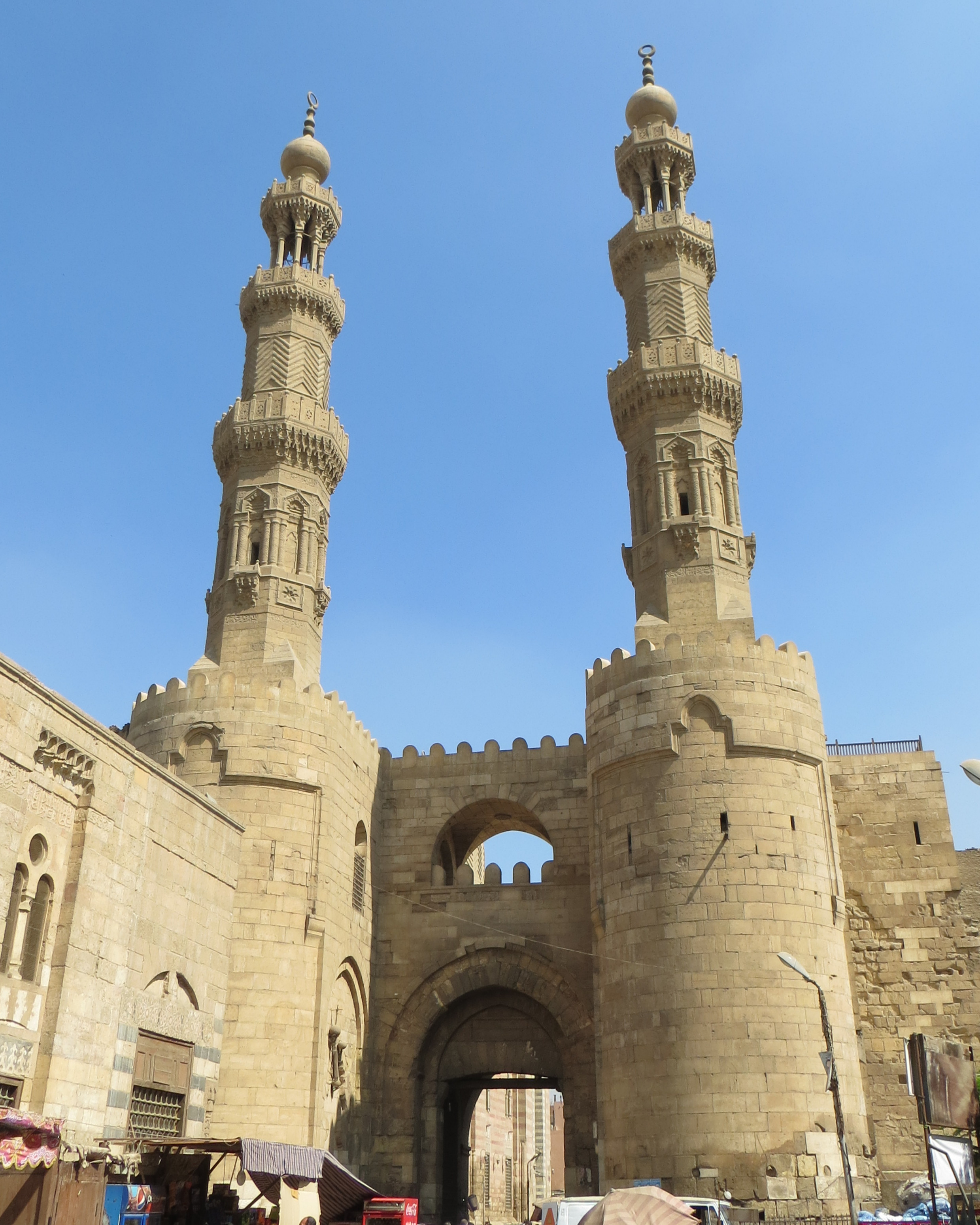
Bab Zuwayla

Bab Zuwayla or Bab Zuweila (Arabic: باب زويلة) is one of three remaining gates in the city walls of historic Cairo in Egypt. It was also known as Bawabat al-Mitwali or Bab al-Mitwali. The gate was built in 1092 by the Fatimid vizier Badr al-Jamali. The two minaret towers on top of it were added between 1415 and 1422 as part of the construction of the adjacent Mosque of Sultan al-Muayyad. Today it remains one of the major landmarks of Cairo.

== Name ==
Its name comes from Bab, meaning "gate", and Zuwayla, a Berber tribe originally from the town of Zawila in the Fezzan. This name was given because Fatimid soldiers from this tribe were lodged in this area when the gate was first created during the Fatimid founding of Cairo in 969. In Coptic tradition, the name was associated with Biblical Zebulun (Coptic: ⲍⲉⲃⲩⲗⲱⲛ).

The gate later acquired the popular name Bab al-Mitwalior Bawabbat al-Mitwali. According to art historian Caroline Williams, this name dates from the Ottoman period. According to historian Nairy Hampikian, the name dates from the 15th century around the time of the construction of the nearby al-Muayyad Mosque, by which time the original association with the Zuwayla tribe in the Fatimid period had faded. The name Mitwali comes from Mitwali al-Qutub, a Muslim saint (wali), possibly fictional, who became associated with the area of the gate.

== Construction and restorations ==
Cairo was founded in 969 to serve as the new capital of the Fatimids right after their successful conquest of Egypt. The original walls of the city and their gates were built in mudbrick. The southern gate was called Bab Zuwayla, also known as Bab al-Qus, and it was originally located at a site about 100 metres (330 ft) north of the current gate, close to the present-day mosque of Sam Ibn Nuh. In 1092, the Fatimid vizier Badr al-Jamali refortified the city with slightly expanded city walls. The southern gate was rebuilt in stone at its current location and today's structure dates from this time. The upper gate was accessed via an L-shaped staircase on its northeast side.

After al-Jamali's construction, various other constructions followed around it. A food storage facility called al-Ahra al-Sultaniyya occupied the space on the northwest side of the gate. The al-Salih Tala'i Mosque was built on its south side in 1160. After this, various commercial structures were erected on the north side of the gate, including the Qaysariyyat Sunqur al-Ashqar, the Darb al-Saffira, the Qaysariyyat Raslan, the Qaysariyyat al-Fadil, and two hammams (bathhouses). A drinking trough for animals was also added on the south side of the gate.

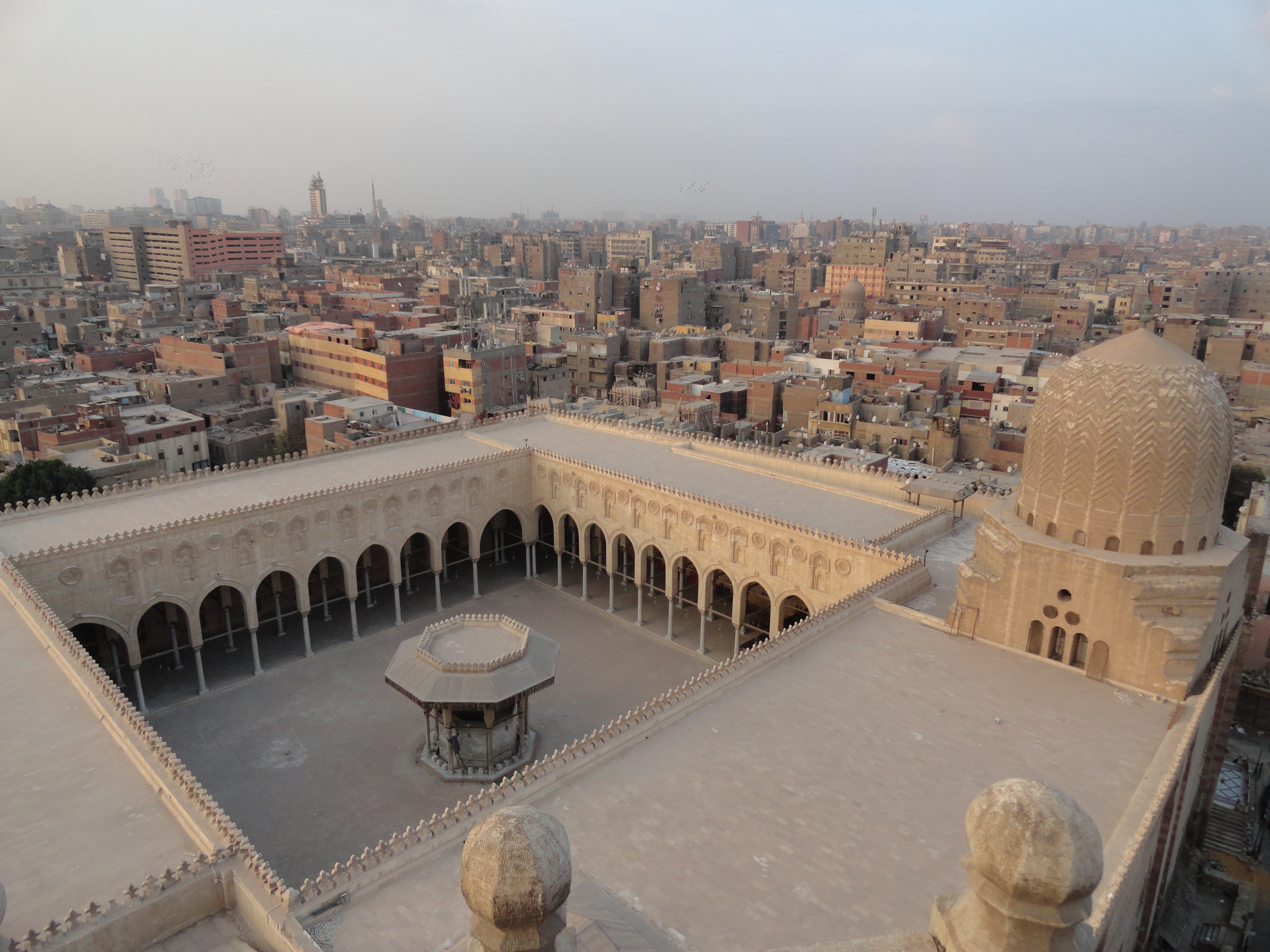
Mosque of Sultan al-Muayyad, as seen from the minarets on top of Bab Zuwayla. The mosque and the two minarets were built between 1415 and 1422.

In 1218, al-Ahra al-Sultaniyya was replaced by a prison known as Shama'il's prison. This prison at one point held the future Sultan al-Mu'ayyad Shaykh, who was imprisoned during the reign of Faraj ibn Barquq and vowed to turn the prison into a religious and educational complex if he ever came to power. In 1408, al-Mu'ayyad built a zawiya (meaning a small prayer room) and sabil (water dispensary) to the south, directly across from the gate, and after winning the Mamluk throne he demolished the prison and replaced it with the large Mosque of al-Mu'ayyad Shaykh between 1415 and 1422. He re-used the two bastions of the gate as bases for two minarets to accompany his mosque, which remain standing today. Inscriptions on the minarets record the name of the craftsman or architect, al-Mu'allim Muhammad ibn al-Qazzaz, and their completion: the western minaret was finished in 1419 and the eastern one in 1420. A new vaulted space was carved out inside the gate's structure in order to accommodate a secondary entrance to the mosque and to house a library (kitabkhana). In addition to the mosque, al-Mu'ayyad constructed other commercial structures in the vicinity, including shops inside the gate's passage and along the façade of his mosque, and he attached a residential complex (tibaq) to the top of the gate.

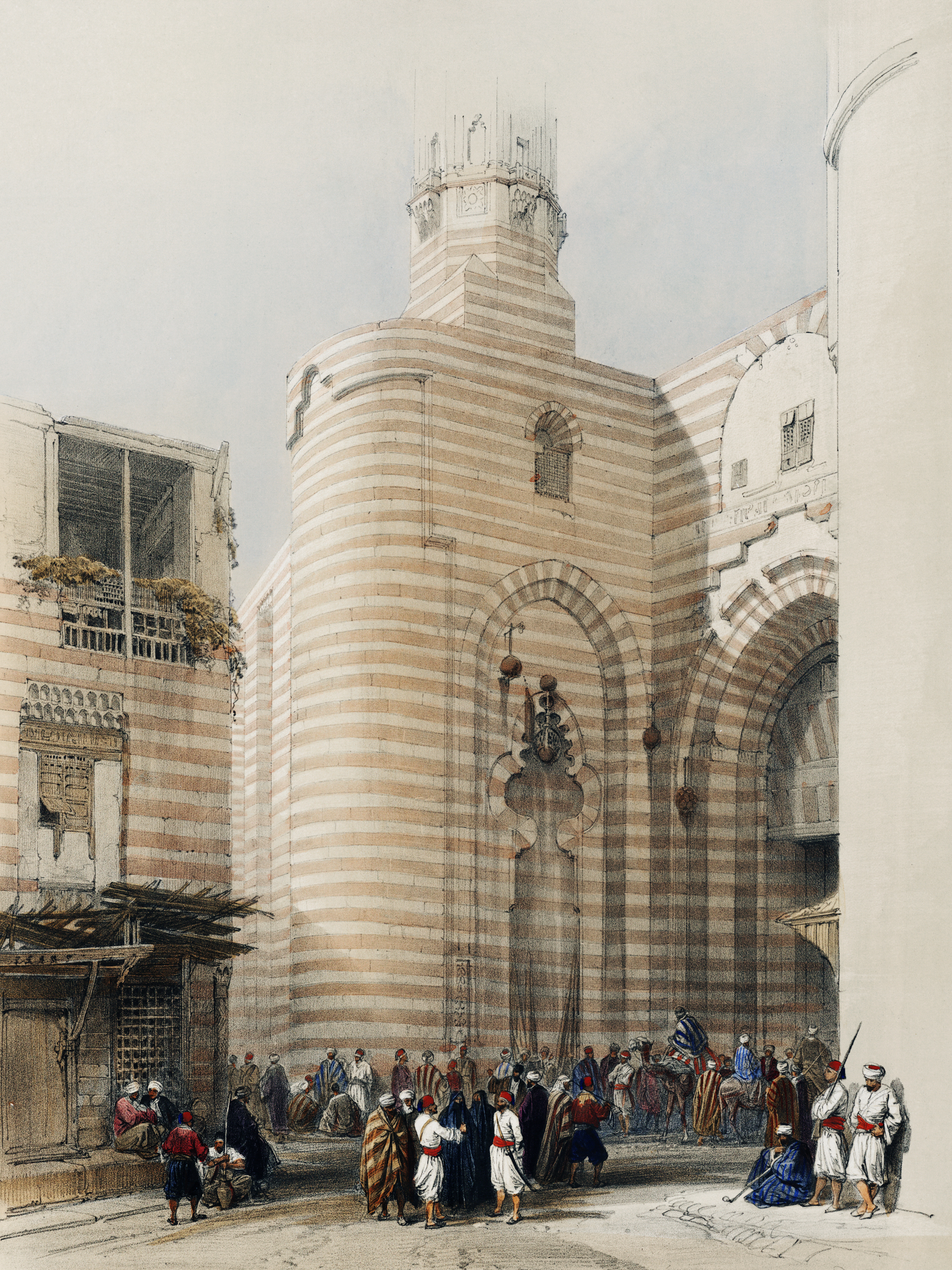
Illustration by David Roberts circa 1848, showing the white and red stripes formerly painted over the gate

The next major changes to the area occurred around 1650 when Radwan Bey constructed a market street (today's al-Khayyamiyya) and a palatial complex just south of the gate. It may be around this time that the gate was plastered and given white and red stripes, which are visible in old paintings and photos of the gate. During the 18th century, urban and residential construction encroached on the area, covering parts of the old city wall as well as the staircase that led to the upper part of the gate. Among these constructions were two large houses named after al-Alayli and al-Qayati, which stood on the southeast side of the gate.

The red and white stripes were probably re-painted before the opening of the Suez Canal in 1869. Sometime between 1860 and 1875, the tops of the minarets collapsed, while in 1880 a flat stone lintel beneath the arch of the gateway was destroyed in order to make room for the mahmal procession.

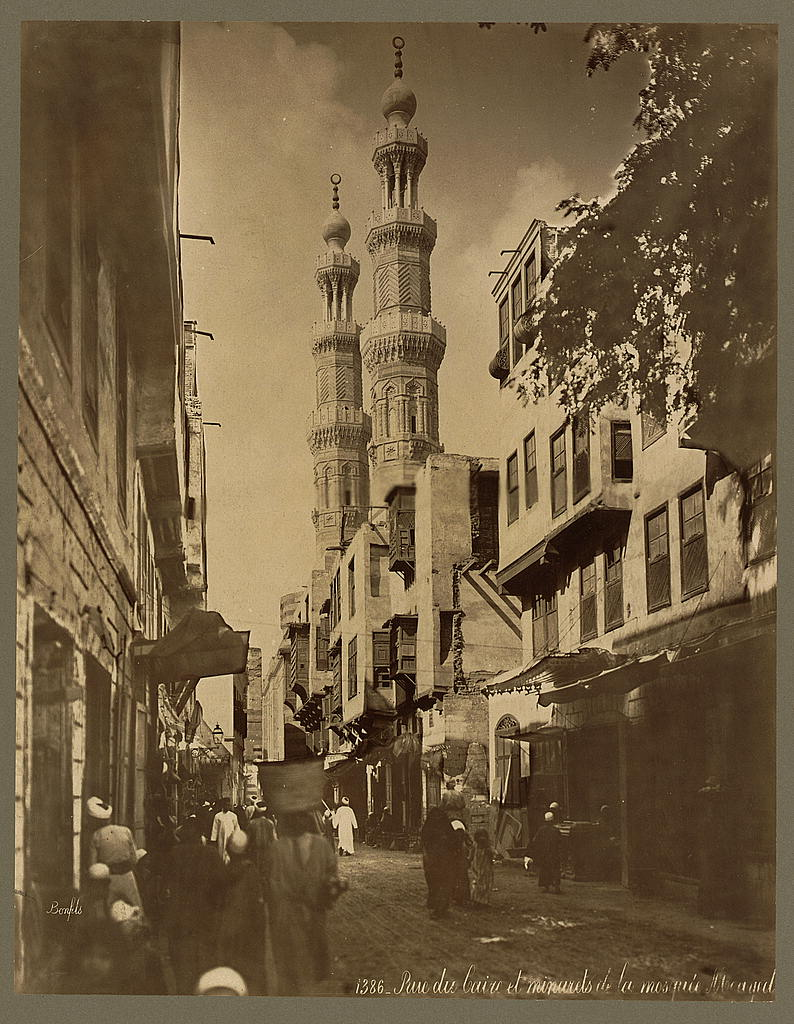
View of street to the east of Bab Zuwayla in 1867, with the old houses of al-Alayli, al-Qayati and others visible on the right

From the 1880s onward, the newly created Comité de Conservation des Monuments de l'Art Arabe (charged with conservation and restoration of the city's Islamic-era monuments) began a series of works to restore the gate and the nearby mosques. These works also cleared or moved many of the urban structures that had encroached on the gate over the previous centuries. The most recent major restoration was carried out between 1999 and 2003 by the American Research Center in Egypt. During this work, the base of the gate and its doors were excavated, as the ground level has risen nearly two metres since the Fatimid period.

== Historical uses ==
The gate also served as a venue for public executions and the heads of executed criminals or political enemies were often put on display on spikes above the gate. One such occurrence was in 1260, when the Mongol leader Hulagu was preparing to attack Egypt and sent six messengers to the Mamluk ruler Qutuz in Cairo, demanding his surrender. Qutuz responded by killing the six envoys, halving them at the waist, and displaying their heads on Bab Zuwayla. The Mamluks went on to confront and defeat the Mongols at the Battle of Ain Jalut. The last Mamluk sultan, Tuman Bay II, was hanged here in 1517 on the orders of Selim II after the Ottoman conquest of Egypt. The gate was still used as a place of execution in the time of Muhammad Ali in the early 19th century.

In the early Mamluk period, sultans would sit on the platform above the gate to watch the procession carrying the mahmal (ceremonial palanquin) as part of the annual pilgrimage (hajj) to Mecca. On a daily basis, drummers would also be positioned on this platform and would play their drums whenever an important Mamluk amir (commander) entered the city.

At some point, a tradition developed whereby the gate also became a religious site associated with Mitwali al-Qutub, an imaginary Muslim saint (wali) whose name also became the popular name of the gate. Local people came to pray here for the saint's intercession in times of need. They would hang hair, a piece of clothing, or some other item on the doors of the gate in order to supplicate for Mitwali's assistance against sickness.

== Architecture ==
The gate's design resembles Bab al-Futuh to the north, consisting of two semi-circular bastion towers with an arched passage between them, built in stone. A platform and a vaulted loggia sits atop the structure. The inner sides of the towers, on either side of the entry archway, are decorated with blind multilobed arches. Such arches existed in western Islamic architecture and may reflect the influence of North African craftsmen that the Fatimids brought east with them when they took over Egypt. The massive doors of the gate are made of wood and each door leaf weighs about three and a half tons. The former lintel of the gate's archway, rediscovered during the restoration works of 1999–2003, was a spoliated stone block from the Pharaonic era, originally from the Temple of On in Heliopolis.

The original inscriptions on the gate have not survived intact. Only one partially-preserved inscription in Kufic Arabic can be seen, above the main archway. It contains the shahada in its Shi'i form, which translates as: "In the name of Allah the Beneficent, the Merciful. There is no deity other than God alone, He has no associate. Muhammad is the messenger of God, ‘Ali is the friend of God. May God bless them both, and the Imams, and all their progeny." This is then followed by the Throne Verse of the Qur'an. The Shi'i wording is indicative of the Fatimid period and the full inscription was probably similar to those of the contemporary Bab al-Futuh and Bab al-Nasr gates.

On the inside, the gate's passageway is covered by a dome with pendentives. On the east side of the passage (on the right when entering the city) is a large niche covered by a semi-dome with two decorative squinches carved with shell motifs. On the west side is a large opening with an iron grille and a muqarnas cornice above, which dates to the modifications made under Mamluk sultan al-Mu'ayyad.

The design of the gate, and of Badr al-Jamali's fortifications in general, appears to come from Byzantine and/or northern Syrian influences. The Mamluk-era historian al-Maqrizi states that the three surviving gates of this period (Bab Zuwayla, Bab al-Futuh, and Bab al-Nasr) were designed by three Christian monks from Edessa (present-day Urfa in Turkey). Creswell believed that it reflected Armenian influences due to Badr al-Jamali's Armenian ethnicity, but no surviving examples of Armenian architecture can confirm this.

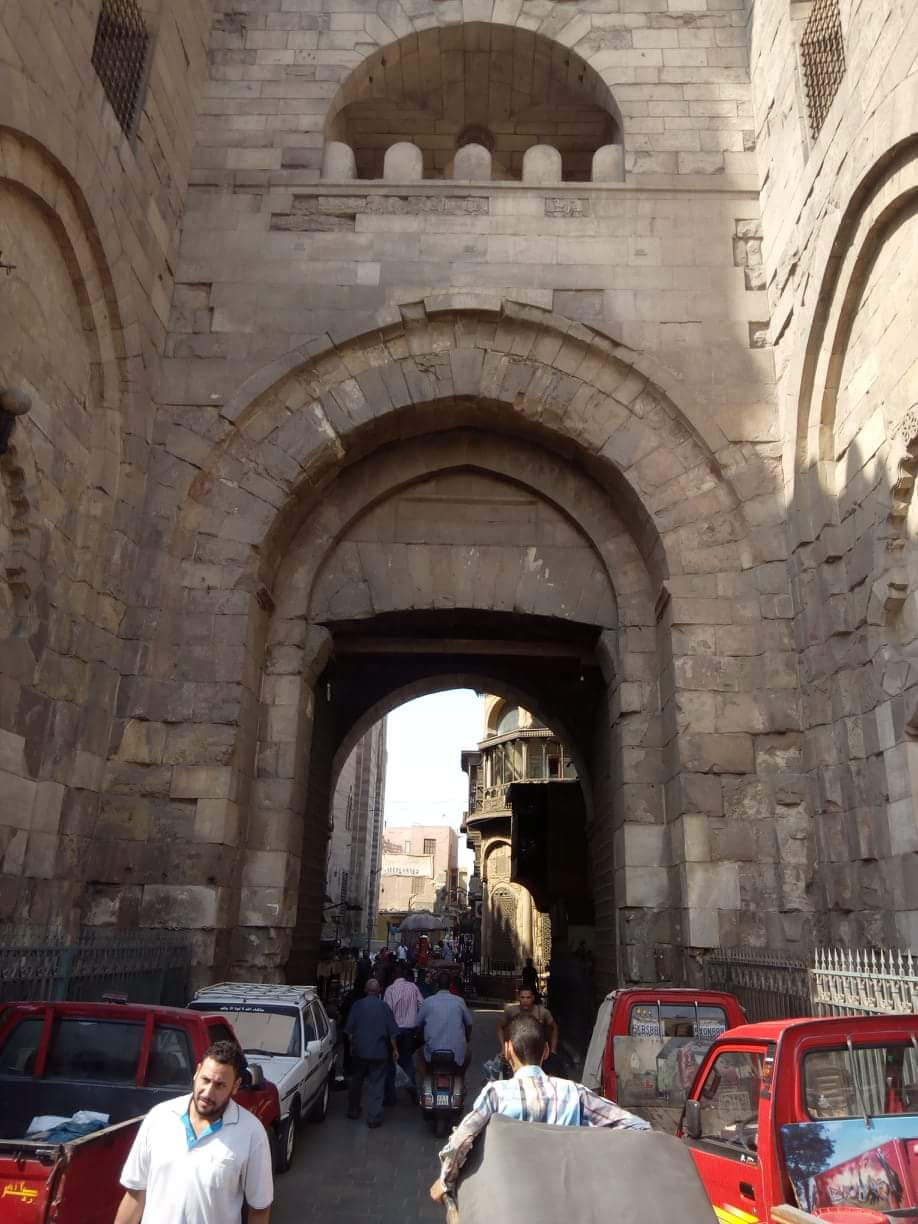
Archway of the gate

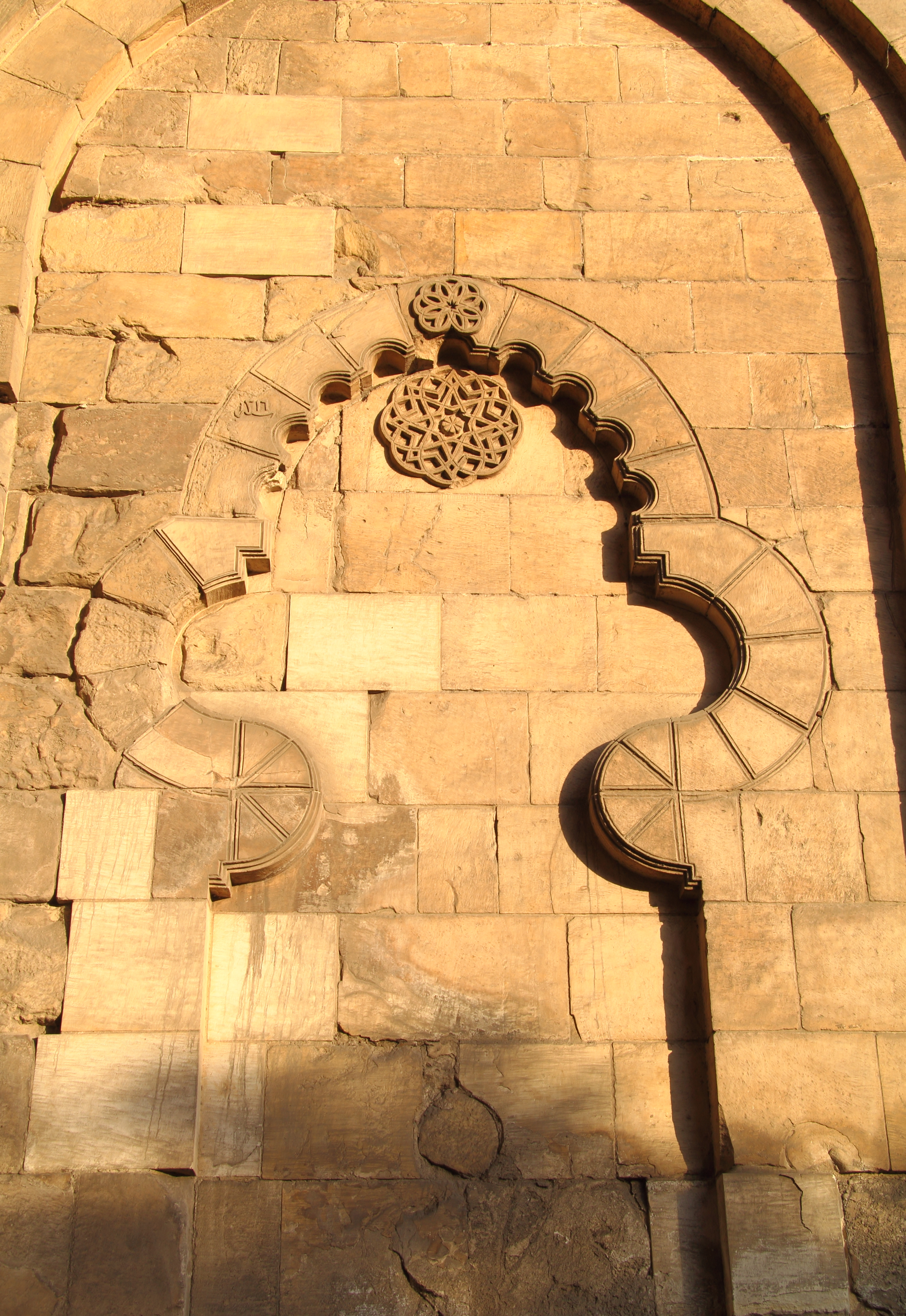
One of the decorative multilobed arches carved into the sides of the gate's bastions

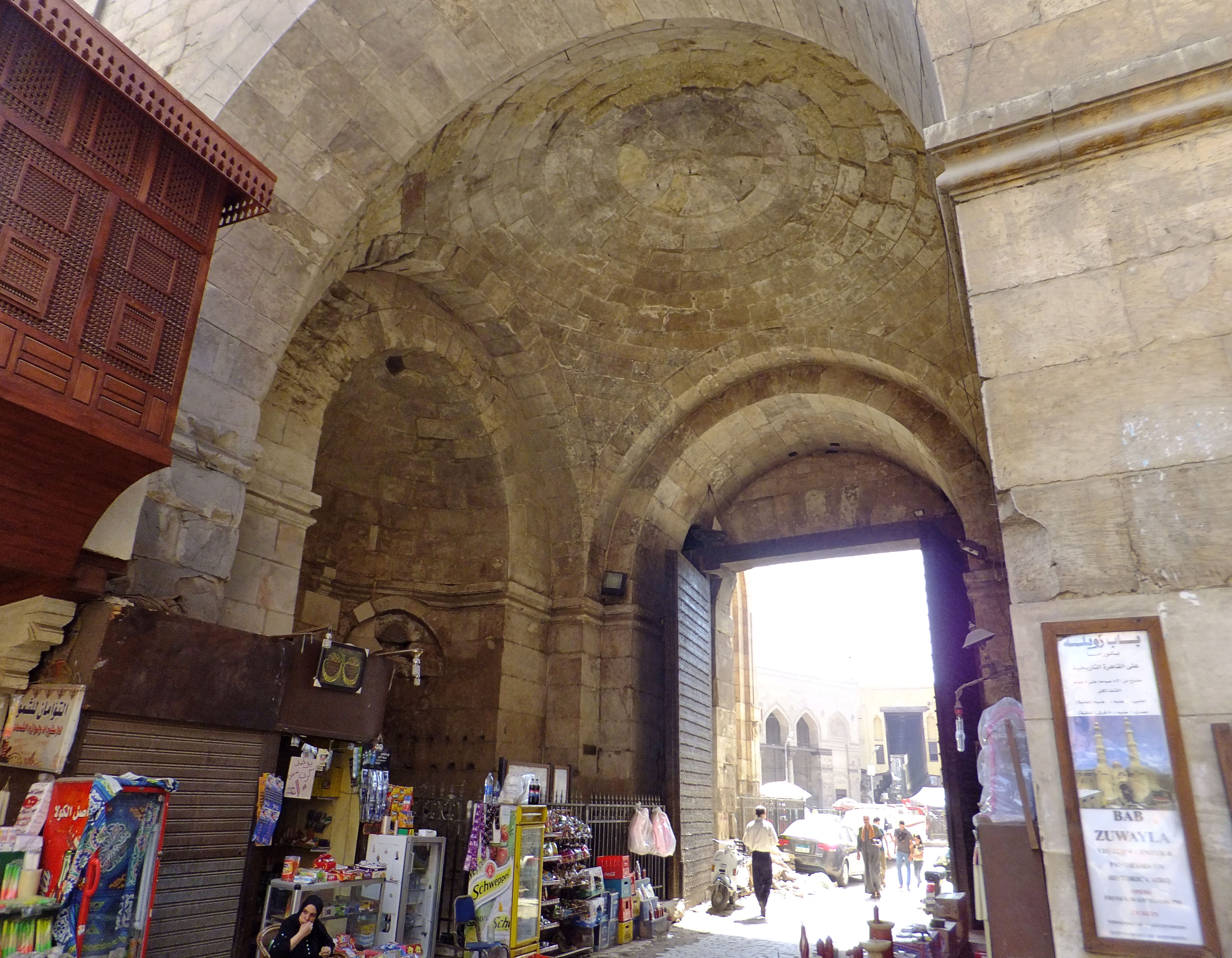
The domed passage of the gate

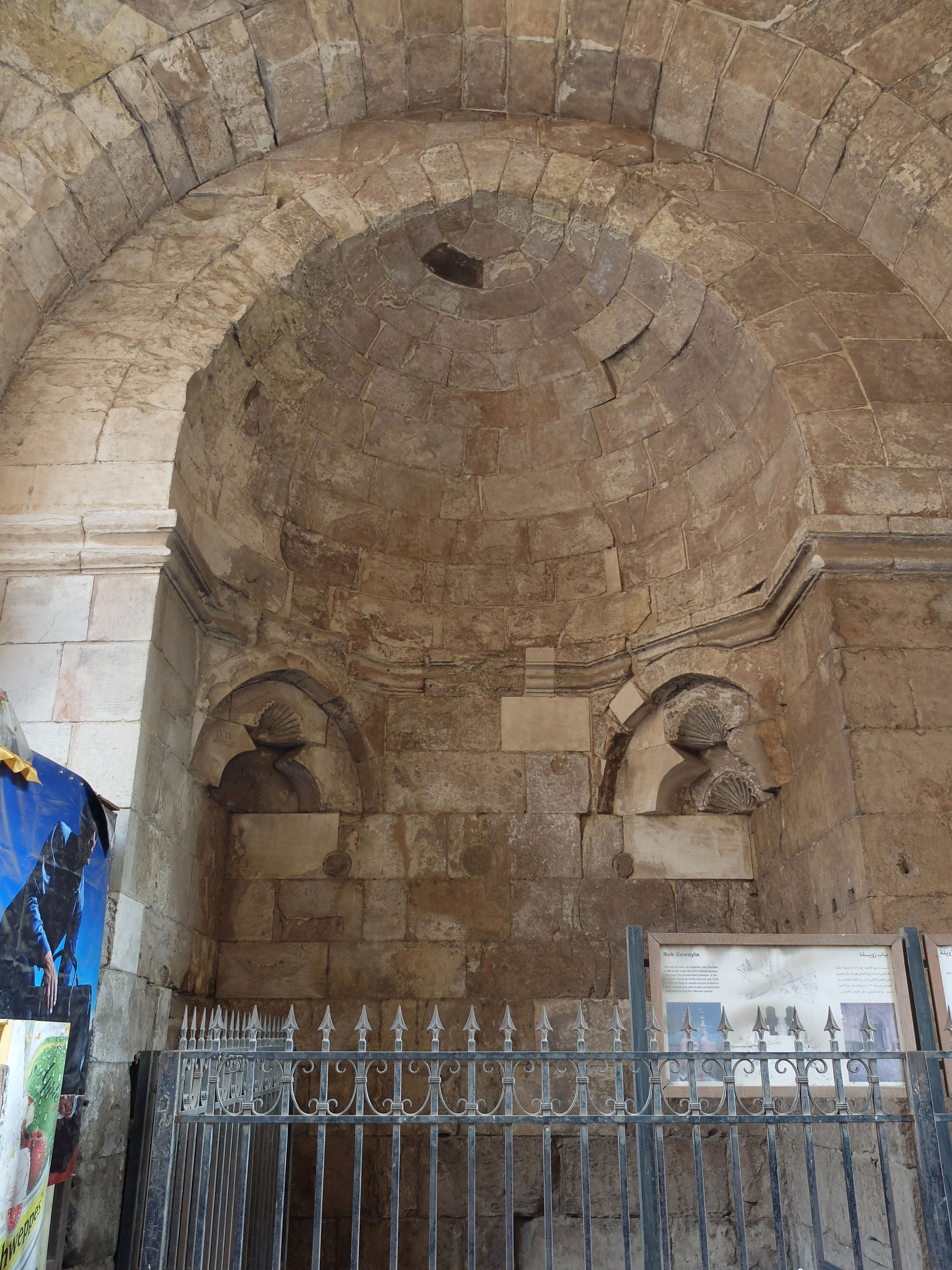
Niche on the east side of the gate's passage

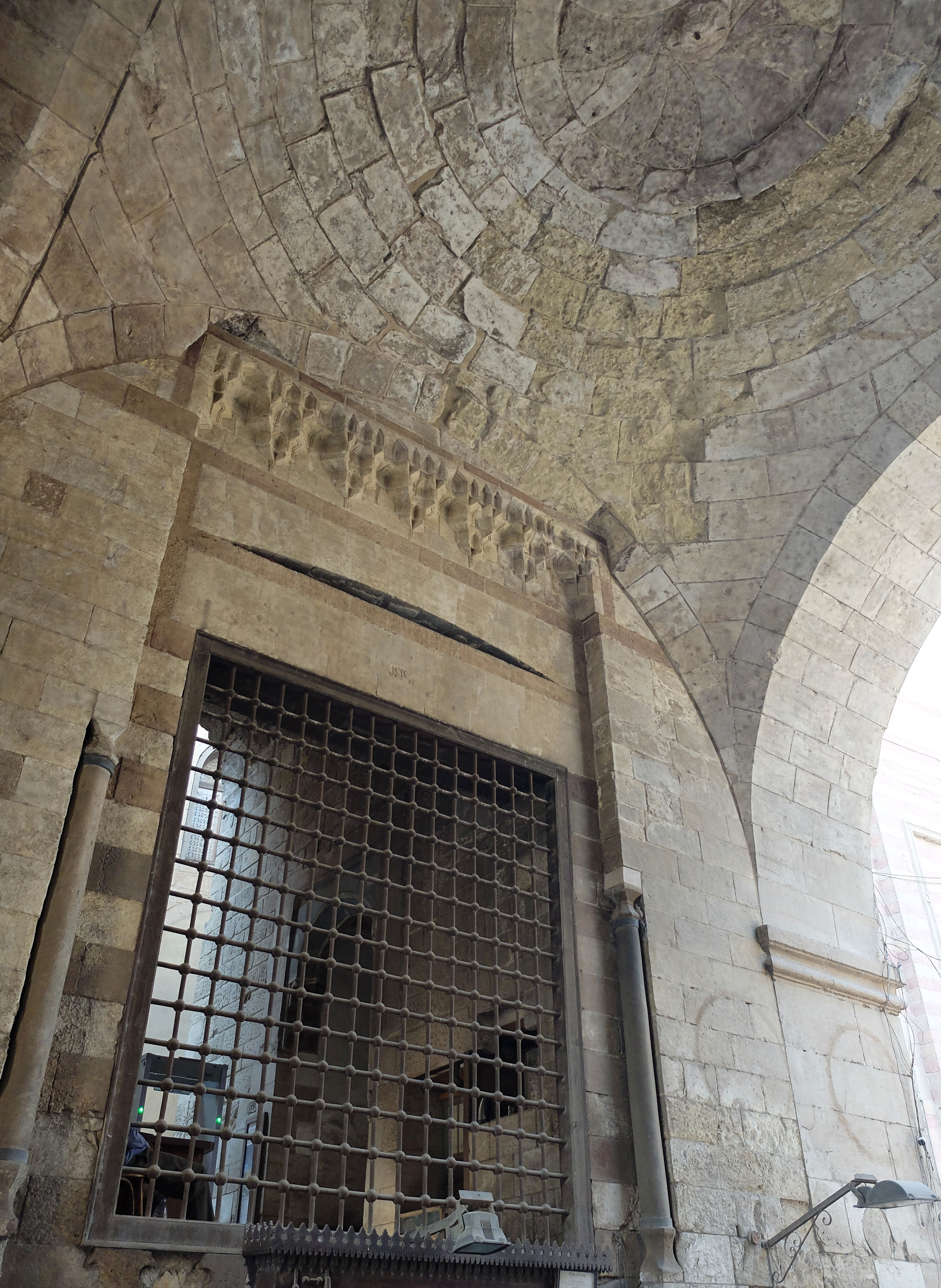
Opening on the west side of the gate's passage

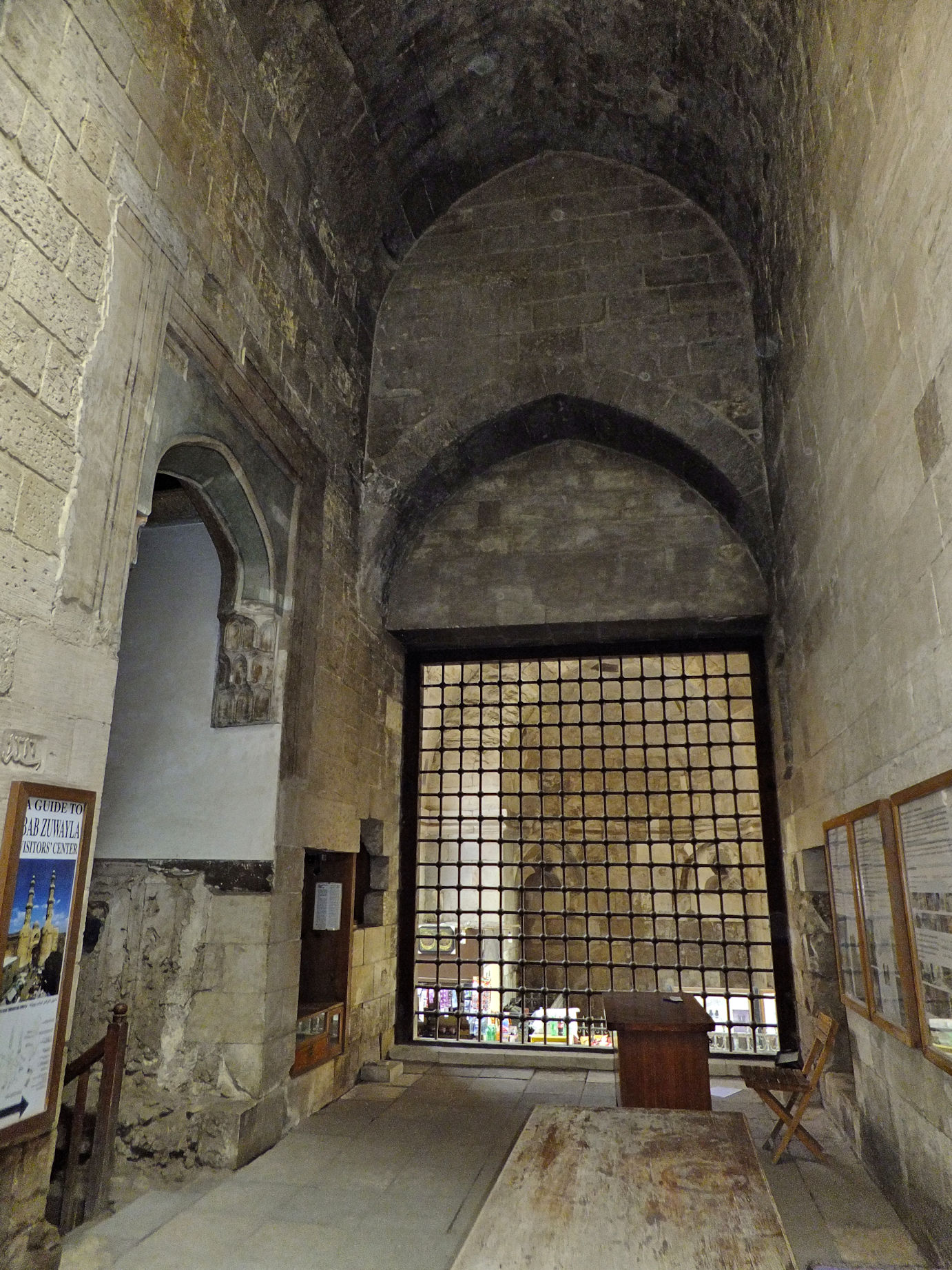
Hall and exhibition space inside the western bastion

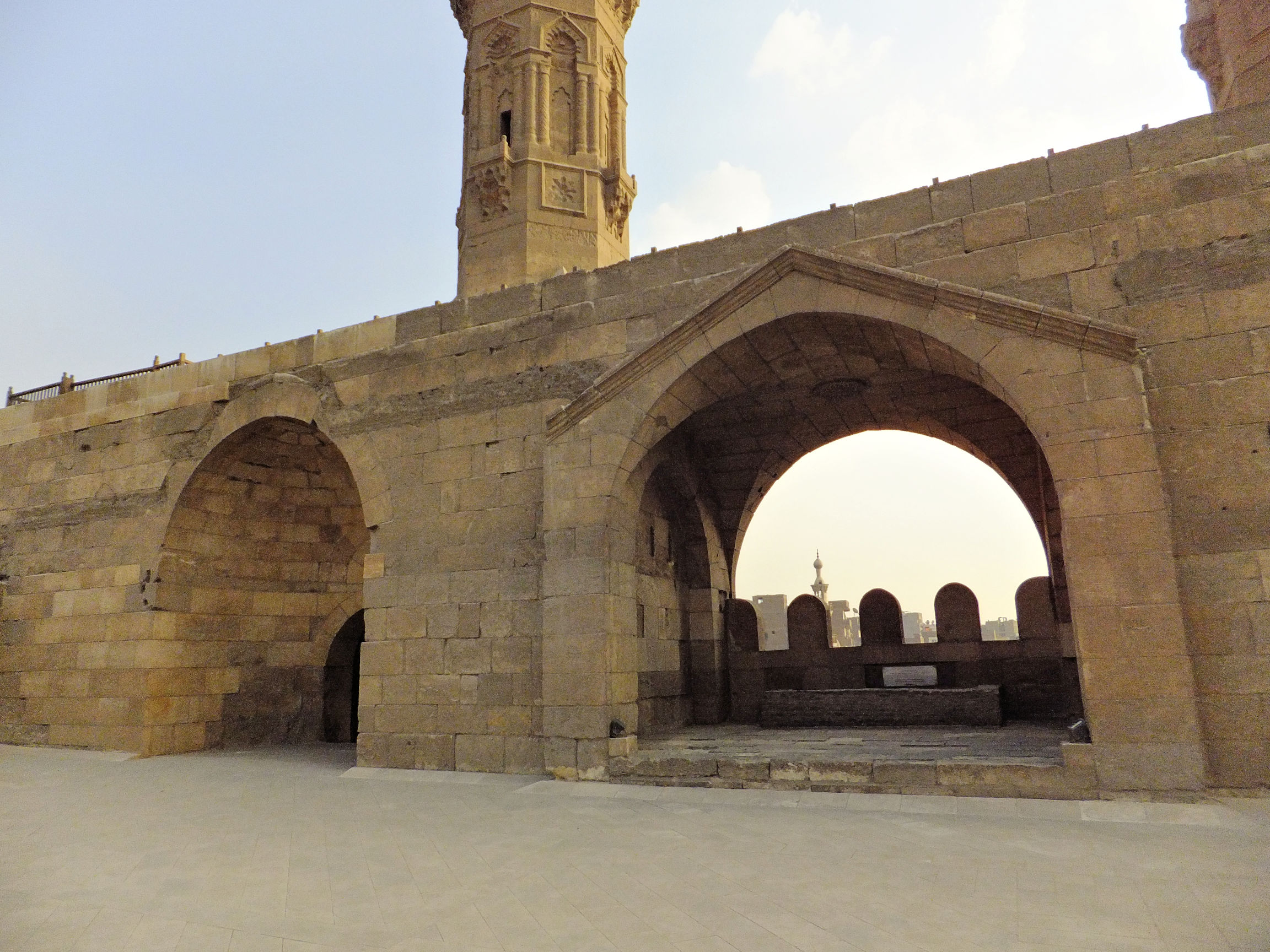
Platform and loggia above the gate

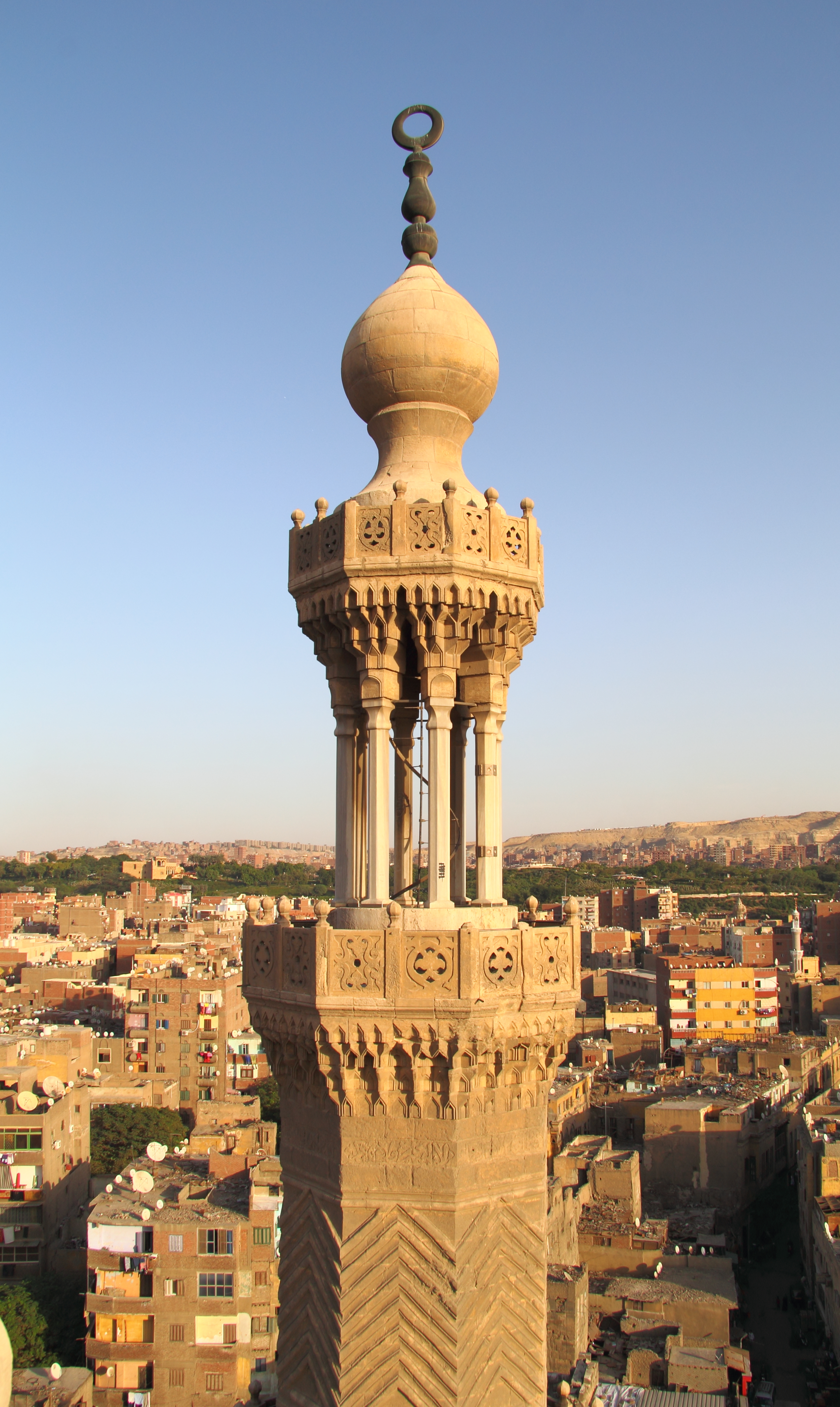
Detail of one of the minarets above the gate

== See also ==
- Gates of Cairo
- High medieval domes
